

461001–461100 

|-bgcolor=#E9E9E9
| 461001 ||  || — || October 3, 2006 || Mount Lemmon || Mount Lemmon Survey || — || align=right | 2.6 km || 
|-id=002 bgcolor=#fefefe
| 461002 ||  || — || March 2, 2005 || Socorro || LINEAR || — || align=right | 1.6 km || 
|-id=003 bgcolor=#d6d6d6
| 461003 ||  || — || February 11, 2004 || Kitt Peak || Spacewatch || Tj (2.98) || align=right | 4.3 km || 
|-id=004 bgcolor=#d6d6d6
| 461004 ||  || — || March 10, 2011 || Kitt Peak || Spacewatch || — || align=right | 3.1 km || 
|-id=005 bgcolor=#d6d6d6
| 461005 ||  || — || October 24, 2008 || Kitt Peak || Spacewatch || VER || align=right | 2.5 km || 
|-id=006 bgcolor=#d6d6d6
| 461006 ||  || — || January 8, 2010 || Mount Lemmon || Mount Lemmon Survey || LIX || align=right | 3.2 km || 
|-id=007 bgcolor=#fefefe
| 461007 ||  || — || February 9, 2005 || Kitt Peak || Spacewatch || — || align=right | 1.2 km || 
|-id=008 bgcolor=#d6d6d6
| 461008 ||  || — || September 21, 2009 || Kitt Peak || Spacewatch || — || align=right | 2.1 km || 
|-id=009 bgcolor=#d6d6d6
| 461009 ||  || — || May 22, 2006 || Kitt Peak || Spacewatch || HYG || align=right | 2.6 km || 
|-id=010 bgcolor=#d6d6d6
| 461010 ||  || — || February 27, 2006 || Kitt Peak || Spacewatch || — || align=right | 3.8 km || 
|-id=011 bgcolor=#E9E9E9
| 461011 ||  || — || February 10, 2008 || Kitt Peak || Spacewatch || — || align=right | 1.5 km || 
|-id=012 bgcolor=#d6d6d6
| 461012 ||  || — || November 17, 2009 || Mount Lemmon || Mount Lemmon Survey || — || align=right | 3.3 km || 
|-id=013 bgcolor=#d6d6d6
| 461013 ||  || — || August 25, 2008 || Siding Spring || SSS || Tj (2.94) || align=right | 4.1 km || 
|-id=014 bgcolor=#E9E9E9
| 461014 ||  || — || January 10, 2002 || Campo Imperatore || CINEOS || ADE || align=right | 2.0 km || 
|-id=015 bgcolor=#d6d6d6
| 461015 ||  || — || January 30, 2006 || Kitt Peak || Spacewatch || — || align=right | 3.3 km || 
|-id=016 bgcolor=#d6d6d6
| 461016 ||  || — || July 29, 2008 || Kitt Peak || Spacewatch || — || align=right | 3.9 km || 
|-id=017 bgcolor=#d6d6d6
| 461017 ||  || — || June 8, 2007 || Kitt Peak || Spacewatch || — || align=right | 3.8 km || 
|-id=018 bgcolor=#d6d6d6
| 461018 ||  || — || October 19, 2007 || Kitt Peak || Spacewatch || 7:4 || align=right | 3.6 km || 
|-id=019 bgcolor=#d6d6d6
| 461019 ||  || — || January 22, 2006 || Mount Lemmon || Mount Lemmon Survey || KOR || align=right | 1.3 km || 
|-id=020 bgcolor=#E9E9E9
| 461020 ||  || — || December 28, 2005 || Mount Lemmon || Mount Lemmon Survey || — || align=right | 2.1 km || 
|-id=021 bgcolor=#d6d6d6
| 461021 ||  || — || October 7, 2008 || Kitt Peak || Spacewatch || — || align=right | 3.2 km || 
|-id=022 bgcolor=#d6d6d6
| 461022 ||  || — || January 15, 2005 || Kitt Peak || Spacewatch || — || align=right | 3.5 km || 
|-id=023 bgcolor=#d6d6d6
| 461023 ||  || — || December 18, 2009 || Mount Lemmon || Mount Lemmon Survey || — || align=right | 2.4 km || 
|-id=024 bgcolor=#d6d6d6
| 461024 ||  || — || December 1, 2003 || Kitt Peak || Spacewatch || — || align=right | 3.1 km || 
|-id=025 bgcolor=#d6d6d6
| 461025 ||  || — || October 28, 2008 || Kitt Peak || Spacewatch || — || align=right | 3.5 km || 
|-id=026 bgcolor=#d6d6d6
| 461026 ||  || — || December 18, 2003 || Socorro || LINEAR || — || align=right | 3.3 km || 
|-id=027 bgcolor=#d6d6d6
| 461027 ||  || — || October 12, 1998 || Kitt Peak || Spacewatch || — || align=right | 2.5 km || 
|-id=028 bgcolor=#E9E9E9
| 461028 ||  || — || November 25, 2005 || Kitt Peak || Spacewatch || PAD || align=right | 1.5 km || 
|-id=029 bgcolor=#d6d6d6
| 461029 ||  || — || October 6, 2008 || Mount Lemmon || Mount Lemmon Survey || — || align=right | 3.2 km || 
|-id=030 bgcolor=#d6d6d6
| 461030 ||  || — || May 22, 2006 || Kitt Peak || Spacewatch || — || align=right | 4.2 km || 
|-id=031 bgcolor=#d6d6d6
| 461031 ||  || — || May 3, 2006 || Kitt Peak || Spacewatch || — || align=right | 4.6 km || 
|-id=032 bgcolor=#E9E9E9
| 461032 ||  || — || October 29, 2005 || Catalina || CSS || — || align=right | 1.7 km || 
|-id=033 bgcolor=#E9E9E9
| 461033 ||  || — || April 10, 2002 || Socorro || LINEAR || — || align=right | 2.3 km || 
|-id=034 bgcolor=#d6d6d6
| 461034 ||  || — || November 30, 1995 || Kitt Peak || Spacewatch || BRA || align=right | 1.6 km || 
|-id=035 bgcolor=#E9E9E9
| 461035 ||  || — || December 27, 2006 || Mount Lemmon || Mount Lemmon Survey || — || align=right | 1.2 km || 
|-id=036 bgcolor=#d6d6d6
| 461036 ||  || — || March 26, 2006 || Kitt Peak || Spacewatch || — || align=right | 3.3 km || 
|-id=037 bgcolor=#d6d6d6
| 461037 ||  || — || October 9, 2007 || Mount Lemmon || Mount Lemmon Survey || — || align=right | 3.9 km || 
|-id=038 bgcolor=#d6d6d6
| 461038 ||  || — || November 19, 1998 || Kitt Peak || Spacewatch || — || align=right | 4.4 km || 
|-id=039 bgcolor=#d6d6d6
| 461039 ||  || — || November 8, 2009 || Catalina || CSS || — || align=right | 3.0 km || 
|-id=040 bgcolor=#d6d6d6
| 461040 ||  || — || February 13, 2010 || Socorro || LINEAR || — || align=right | 2.5 km || 
|-id=041 bgcolor=#E9E9E9
| 461041 ||  || — || December 4, 2005 || Kitt Peak || Spacewatch || HOF || align=right | 3.0 km || 
|-id=042 bgcolor=#E9E9E9
| 461042 ||  || — || August 31, 2000 || Socorro || LINEAR || — || align=right | 2.4 km || 
|-id=043 bgcolor=#d6d6d6
| 461043 ||  || — || October 9, 2008 || Catalina || CSS || — || align=right | 3.3 km || 
|-id=044 bgcolor=#d6d6d6
| 461044 ||  || — || September 26, 2009 || Kitt Peak || Spacewatch || — || align=right | 3.3 km || 
|-id=045 bgcolor=#d6d6d6
| 461045 ||  || — || October 1, 2003 || Anderson Mesa || LONEOS || — || align=right | 4.1 km || 
|-id=046 bgcolor=#E9E9E9
| 461046 ||  || — || November 20, 2001 || Socorro || LINEAR || — || align=right | 1.9 km || 
|-id=047 bgcolor=#d6d6d6
| 461047 ||  || — || December 16, 2004 || Kitt Peak || Spacewatch || — || align=right | 2.2 km || 
|-id=048 bgcolor=#d6d6d6
| 461048 ||  || — || October 26, 2003 || Kitt Peak || Spacewatch || — || align=right | 3.5 km || 
|-id=049 bgcolor=#d6d6d6
| 461049 ||  || — || September 29, 2008 || Mount Lemmon || Mount Lemmon Survey || EOS || align=right | 1.9 km || 
|-id=050 bgcolor=#d6d6d6
| 461050 ||  || — || May 1, 2012 || Mount Lemmon || Mount Lemmon Survey || — || align=right | 3.5 km || 
|-id=051 bgcolor=#d6d6d6
| 461051 ||  || — || June 10, 2007 || Kitt Peak || Spacewatch || — || align=right | 3.2 km || 
|-id=052 bgcolor=#E9E9E9
| 461052 ||  || — || October 23, 2009 || Kitt Peak || Spacewatch || — || align=right | 3.3 km || 
|-id=053 bgcolor=#d6d6d6
| 461053 ||  || — || September 30, 2003 || Kitt Peak || Spacewatch || — || align=right | 3.3 km || 
|-id=054 bgcolor=#E9E9E9
| 461054 ||  || — || December 28, 2005 || Kitt Peak || Spacewatch || — || align=right | 2.7 km || 
|-id=055 bgcolor=#d6d6d6
| 461055 ||  || — || December 29, 1997 || Kitt Peak || Spacewatch || — || align=right | 4.8 km || 
|-id=056 bgcolor=#E9E9E9
| 461056 ||  || — || January 5, 2006 || Catalina || CSS || HOF || align=right | 3.4 km || 
|-id=057 bgcolor=#d6d6d6
| 461057 ||  || — || November 26, 2003 || Kitt Peak || Spacewatch || EOS || align=right | 1.7 km || 
|-id=058 bgcolor=#d6d6d6
| 461058 ||  || — || November 14, 1996 || Kitt Peak || Spacewatch || — || align=right | 3.9 km || 
|-id=059 bgcolor=#E9E9E9
| 461059 ||  || — || February 11, 2011 || Mount Lemmon || Mount Lemmon Survey || AGN || align=right | 1.2 km || 
|-id=060 bgcolor=#d6d6d6
| 461060 ||  || — || September 30, 2008 || Catalina || CSS || EOS || align=right | 1.9 km || 
|-id=061 bgcolor=#E9E9E9
| 461061 ||  || — || October 1, 2009 || Mount Lemmon || Mount Lemmon Survey || — || align=right | 2.0 km || 
|-id=062 bgcolor=#E9E9E9
| 461062 ||  || — || October 8, 2005 || Anderson Mesa || LONEOS || — || align=right | 2.2 km || 
|-id=063 bgcolor=#d6d6d6
| 461063 ||  || — || November 19, 2009 || Kitt Peak || Spacewatch || — || align=right | 3.5 km || 
|-id=064 bgcolor=#E9E9E9
| 461064 ||  || — || July 3, 1995 || Kitt Peak || Spacewatch || — || align=right | 2.2 km || 
|-id=065 bgcolor=#d6d6d6
| 461065 ||  || — || October 28, 2008 || Mount Lemmon || Mount Lemmon Survey || — || align=right | 3.4 km || 
|-id=066 bgcolor=#d6d6d6
| 461066 ||  || — || March 29, 2010 || WISE || WISE || — || align=right | 4.6 km || 
|-id=067 bgcolor=#E9E9E9
| 461067 ||  || — || October 28, 2005 || Mount Lemmon || Mount Lemmon Survey || — || align=right | 2.5 km || 
|-id=068 bgcolor=#d6d6d6
| 461068 ||  || — || April 11, 2005 || Kitt Peak || Spacewatch || HYG || align=right | 2.9 km || 
|-id=069 bgcolor=#d6d6d6
| 461069 ||  || — || November 18, 2008 || Kitt Peak || Spacewatch || — || align=right | 3.1 km || 
|-id=070 bgcolor=#E9E9E9
| 461070 ||  || — || April 11, 2007 || Kitt Peak || Spacewatch || — || align=right | 2.4 km || 
|-id=071 bgcolor=#d6d6d6
| 461071 ||  || — || February 1, 2005 || Kitt Peak || Spacewatch || EOS || align=right | 2.2 km || 
|-id=072 bgcolor=#E9E9E9
| 461072 ||  || — || December 27, 2005 || Mount Lemmon || Mount Lemmon Survey || GEF || align=right | 1.6 km || 
|-id=073 bgcolor=#d6d6d6
| 461073 ||  || — || April 6, 2011 || Mount Lemmon || Mount Lemmon Survey || — || align=right | 3.2 km || 
|-id=074 bgcolor=#E9E9E9
| 461074 ||  || — || January 22, 1993 || Kitt Peak || Spacewatch || — || align=right | 3.0 km || 
|-id=075 bgcolor=#d6d6d6
| 461075 ||  || — || January 4, 2010 || Kitt Peak || Spacewatch || — || align=right | 2.9 km || 
|-id=076 bgcolor=#d6d6d6
| 461076 ||  || — || September 18, 2007 || Kitt Peak || Spacewatch || — || align=right | 3.5 km || 
|-id=077 bgcolor=#d6d6d6
| 461077 ||  || — || September 13, 2007 || Mount Lemmon || Mount Lemmon Survey || — || align=right | 3.2 km || 
|-id=078 bgcolor=#d6d6d6
| 461078 ||  || — || December 3, 2008 || Mount Lemmon || Mount Lemmon Survey || — || align=right | 2.6 km || 
|-id=079 bgcolor=#d6d6d6
| 461079 ||  || — || February 12, 2004 || Kitt Peak || Spacewatch || — || align=right | 3.0 km || 
|-id=080 bgcolor=#d6d6d6
| 461080 ||  || — || May 9, 2006 || Mount Lemmon || Mount Lemmon Survey || — || align=right | 3.5 km || 
|-id=081 bgcolor=#d6d6d6
| 461081 ||  || — || January 4, 2010 || Kitt Peak || Spacewatch || — || align=right | 3.3 km || 
|-id=082 bgcolor=#d6d6d6
| 461082 ||  || — || July 22, 2003 || Campo Imperatore || CINEOS || — || align=right | 3.7 km || 
|-id=083 bgcolor=#d6d6d6
| 461083 ||  || — || August 10, 2012 || Kitt Peak || Spacewatch || — || align=right | 3.0 km || 
|-id=084 bgcolor=#d6d6d6
| 461084 ||  || — || February 2, 2006 || Mount Lemmon || Mount Lemmon Survey || KOR || align=right | 1.9 km || 
|-id=085 bgcolor=#d6d6d6
| 461085 ||  || — || April 6, 2005 || Kitt Peak || Spacewatch || — || align=right | 2.4 km || 
|-id=086 bgcolor=#d6d6d6
| 461086 ||  || — || May 7, 2011 || Kitt Peak || Spacewatch || EOS || align=right | 1.8 km || 
|-id=087 bgcolor=#d6d6d6
| 461087 ||  || — || January 19, 2004 || Kitt Peak || Spacewatch || — || align=right | 3.0 km || 
|-id=088 bgcolor=#E9E9E9
| 461088 ||  || — || March 20, 2007 || Kitt Peak || Spacewatch || HOF || align=right | 3.5 km || 
|-id=089 bgcolor=#E9E9E9
| 461089 ||  || — || December 26, 2006 || Kitt Peak || Spacewatch || — || align=right | 4.6 km || 
|-id=090 bgcolor=#E9E9E9
| 461090 ||  || — || December 25, 2005 || Kitt Peak || Spacewatch || — || align=right | 2.8 km || 
|-id=091 bgcolor=#d6d6d6
| 461091 ||  || — || April 19, 2010 || WISE || WISE || — || align=right | 3.9 km || 
|-id=092 bgcolor=#E9E9E9
| 461092 ||  || — || December 9, 2004 || Catalina || CSS || — || align=right | 2.9 km || 
|-id=093 bgcolor=#d6d6d6
| 461093 ||  || — || December 10, 2004 || Socorro || LINEAR || — || align=right | 3.7 km || 
|-id=094 bgcolor=#d6d6d6
| 461094 ||  || — || March 15, 2004 || Kitt Peak || Spacewatch || 7:4 || align=right | 3.8 km || 
|-id=095 bgcolor=#d6d6d6
| 461095 ||  || — || March 3, 2005 || Catalina || CSS || — || align=right | 3.3 km || 
|-id=096 bgcolor=#d6d6d6
| 461096 ||  || — || May 16, 2010 || WISE || WISE || — || align=right | 3.3 km || 
|-id=097 bgcolor=#d6d6d6
| 461097 ||  || — || February 16, 2010 || Kitt Peak || Spacewatch || EOS || align=right | 2.4 km || 
|-id=098 bgcolor=#d6d6d6
| 461098 ||  || — || January 15, 2004 || Kitt Peak || Spacewatch || — || align=right | 3.0 km || 
|-id=099 bgcolor=#E9E9E9
| 461099 ||  || — || June 12, 2004 || Siding Spring || SSS || — || align=right | 1.7 km || 
|-id=100 bgcolor=#E9E9E9
| 461100 ||  || — || October 14, 2009 || Mount Lemmon || Mount Lemmon Survey || AGN || align=right | 1.3 km || 
|}

461101–461200 

|-bgcolor=#d6d6d6
| 461101 ||  || — || May 5, 2010 || WISE || WISE || — || align=right | 4.2 km || 
|-id=102 bgcolor=#E9E9E9
| 461102 ||  || — || September 16, 2009 || Catalina || CSS || — || align=right | 2.7 km || 
|-id=103 bgcolor=#d6d6d6
| 461103 ||  || — || January 22, 2004 || Socorro || LINEAR || — || align=right | 2.0 km || 
|-id=104 bgcolor=#d6d6d6
| 461104 ||  || — || May 9, 2010 || WISE || WISE || — || align=right | 4.7 km || 
|-id=105 bgcolor=#d6d6d6
| 461105 ||  || — || February 13, 2010 || Mount Lemmon || Mount Lemmon Survey || — || align=right | 3.2 km || 
|-id=106 bgcolor=#d6d6d6
| 461106 ||  || — || September 11, 2007 || Kitt Peak || Spacewatch || — || align=right | 4.0 km || 
|-id=107 bgcolor=#d6d6d6
| 461107 ||  || — || November 17, 2007 || Kitt Peak || Spacewatch || 7:4 || align=right | 4.3 km || 
|-id=108 bgcolor=#d6d6d6
| 461108 ||  || — || February 13, 2010 || Catalina || CSS || — || align=right | 3.7 km || 
|-id=109 bgcolor=#d6d6d6
| 461109 ||  || — || September 21, 1995 || Kitt Peak || Spacewatch || — || align=right | 3.1 km || 
|-id=110 bgcolor=#d6d6d6
| 461110 ||  || — || March 13, 2010 || Kitt Peak || Spacewatch || — || align=right | 3.0 km || 
|-id=111 bgcolor=#E9E9E9
| 461111 ||  || — || February 22, 2006 || Anderson Mesa || LONEOS || — || align=right | 3.5 km || 
|-id=112 bgcolor=#d6d6d6
| 461112 ||  || — || February 15, 2010 || Kitt Peak || Spacewatch || — || align=right | 3.0 km || 
|-id=113 bgcolor=#d6d6d6
| 461113 ||  || — || April 5, 2000 || Socorro || LINEAR || EOS || align=right | 2.2 km || 
|-id=114 bgcolor=#d6d6d6
| 461114 ||  || — || February 15, 2004 || Socorro || LINEAR || VER || align=right | 3.5 km || 
|-id=115 bgcolor=#E9E9E9
| 461115 ||  || — || January 20, 1996 || Kitt Peak || Spacewatch || GEF || align=right | 1.3 km || 
|-id=116 bgcolor=#d6d6d6
| 461116 ||  || — || October 3, 2013 || Kitt Peak || Spacewatch || EOS || align=right | 1.8 km || 
|-id=117 bgcolor=#d6d6d6
| 461117 ||  || — || February 3, 2009 || Mount Lemmon || Mount Lemmon Survey || 7:4 || align=right | 4.9 km || 
|-id=118 bgcolor=#d6d6d6
| 461118 ||  || — || December 21, 2003 || Kitt Peak || Spacewatch || — || align=right | 3.7 km || 
|-id=119 bgcolor=#d6d6d6
| 461119 ||  || — || August 26, 2001 || Kitt Peak || Spacewatch || — || align=right | 2.9 km || 
|-id=120 bgcolor=#d6d6d6
| 461120 ||  || — || May 3, 1994 || Kitt Peak || Spacewatch || — || align=right | 4.1 km || 
|-id=121 bgcolor=#E9E9E9
| 461121 ||  || — || February 10, 2002 || Socorro || LINEAR || — || align=right | 1.2 km || 
|-id=122 bgcolor=#d6d6d6
| 461122 ||  || — || February 9, 2010 || Kitt Peak || Spacewatch || — || align=right | 3.8 km || 
|-id=123 bgcolor=#E9E9E9
| 461123 ||  || — || August 3, 2010 || WISE || WISE || — || align=right | 3.2 km || 
|-id=124 bgcolor=#E9E9E9
| 461124 ||  || — || September 13, 2007 || Mount Lemmon || Mount Lemmon Survey || — || align=right data-sort-value="0.59" | 590 m || 
|-id=125 bgcolor=#E9E9E9
| 461125 ||  || — || November 2, 2007 || Mount Lemmon || Mount Lemmon Survey || — || align=right | 3.0 km || 
|-id=126 bgcolor=#d6d6d6
| 461126 ||  || — || January 19, 1996 || Kitt Peak || Spacewatch || — || align=right | 2.9 km || 
|-id=127 bgcolor=#E9E9E9
| 461127 ||  || — || October 11, 2007 || Mount Lemmon || Mount Lemmon Survey || — || align=right data-sort-value="0.88" | 880 m || 
|-id=128 bgcolor=#E9E9E9
| 461128 ||  || — || October 21, 2006 || Mount Lemmon || Mount Lemmon Survey || — || align=right | 2.2 km || 
|-id=129 bgcolor=#d6d6d6
| 461129 ||  || — || February 1, 2012 || Kitt Peak || Spacewatch || EOS || align=right | 2.1 km || 
|-id=130 bgcolor=#d6d6d6
| 461130 ||  || — || January 5, 2006 || Kitt Peak || Spacewatch || — || align=right | 3.1 km || 
|-id=131 bgcolor=#fefefe
| 461131 ||  || — || September 24, 2008 || Kitt Peak || Spacewatch || — || align=right data-sort-value="0.83" | 830 m || 
|-id=132 bgcolor=#E9E9E9
| 461132 ||  || — || June 29, 2010 || WISE || WISE || — || align=right | 2.6 km || 
|-id=133 bgcolor=#d6d6d6
| 461133 ||  || — || September 26, 2005 || Kitt Peak || Spacewatch || — || align=right | 2.5 km || 
|-id=134 bgcolor=#E9E9E9
| 461134 ||  || — || October 2, 2006 || Mount Lemmon || Mount Lemmon Survey || — || align=right | 1.7 km || 
|-id=135 bgcolor=#fefefe
| 461135 ||  || — || April 18, 2007 || Mount Lemmon || Mount Lemmon Survey || — || align=right data-sort-value="0.79" | 790 m || 
|-id=136 bgcolor=#d6d6d6
| 461136 ||  || — || May 11, 2007 || Mount Lemmon || Mount Lemmon Survey || — || align=right | 3.7 km || 
|-id=137 bgcolor=#d6d6d6
| 461137 ||  || — || October 14, 1998 || Caussols || ODAS || — || align=right | 2.9 km || 
|-id=138 bgcolor=#d6d6d6
| 461138 ||  || — || June 5, 2013 || Mount Lemmon || Mount Lemmon Survey || — || align=right | 3.5 km || 
|-id=139 bgcolor=#fefefe
| 461139 ||  || — || September 12, 2007 || Catalina || CSS || — || align=right | 1.0 km || 
|-id=140 bgcolor=#d6d6d6
| 461140 ||  || — || September 22, 2009 || Mount Lemmon || Mount Lemmon Survey || — || align=right | 4.2 km || 
|-id=141 bgcolor=#d6d6d6
| 461141 ||  || — || May 15, 1996 || Kitt Peak || Spacewatch || — || align=right | 2.9 km || 
|-id=142 bgcolor=#fefefe
| 461142 ||  || — || May 14, 2004 || Kitt Peak || Spacewatch || — || align=right data-sort-value="0.76" | 760 m || 
|-id=143 bgcolor=#fefefe
| 461143 ||  || — || January 20, 2009 || Kitt Peak || Spacewatch || — || align=right data-sort-value="0.82" | 820 m || 
|-id=144 bgcolor=#d6d6d6
| 461144 ||  || — || September 30, 2003 || Kitt Peak || Spacewatch || — || align=right | 2.7 km || 
|-id=145 bgcolor=#d6d6d6
| 461145 ||  || — || April 12, 2002 || Kitt Peak || Spacewatch || EOS || align=right | 2.2 km || 
|-id=146 bgcolor=#d6d6d6
| 461146 ||  || — || October 27, 2005 || Catalina || CSS || — || align=right | 2.4 km || 
|-id=147 bgcolor=#E9E9E9
| 461147 ||  || — || January 8, 2000 || Kitt Peak || Spacewatch || — || align=right data-sort-value="0.78" | 780 m || 
|-id=148 bgcolor=#fefefe
| 461148 ||  || — || January 23, 2006 || Mount Lemmon || Mount Lemmon Survey || V || align=right data-sort-value="0.56" | 560 m || 
|-id=149 bgcolor=#fefefe
| 461149 ||  || — || November 20, 2008 || Kitt Peak || Spacewatch || — || align=right | 2.1 km || 
|-id=150 bgcolor=#d6d6d6
| 461150 ||  || — || March 16, 2007 || Mount Lemmon || Mount Lemmon Survey || — || align=right | 2.7 km || 
|-id=151 bgcolor=#d6d6d6
| 461151 ||  || — || December 6, 2010 || Mount Lemmon || Mount Lemmon Survey || — || align=right | 3.2 km || 
|-id=152 bgcolor=#d6d6d6
| 461152 ||  || — || September 2, 2008 || Kitt Peak || Spacewatch || 7:4 || align=right | 2.9 km || 
|-id=153 bgcolor=#fefefe
| 461153 ||  || — || March 11, 2007 || Mount Lemmon || Mount Lemmon Survey || — || align=right data-sort-value="0.67" | 670 m || 
|-id=154 bgcolor=#E9E9E9
| 461154 ||  || — || March 10, 2000 || Kitt Peak || Spacewatch || — || align=right data-sort-value="0.88" | 880 m || 
|-id=155 bgcolor=#fefefe
| 461155 ||  || — || February 27, 2009 || Mount Lemmon || Mount Lemmon Survey || — || align=right data-sort-value="0.81" | 810 m || 
|-id=156 bgcolor=#E9E9E9
| 461156 ||  || — || January 10, 2008 || Kitt Peak || Spacewatch || — || align=right | 1.4 km || 
|-id=157 bgcolor=#d6d6d6
| 461157 ||  || — || January 29, 2011 || Mount Lemmon || Mount Lemmon Survey || — || align=right | 2.5 km || 
|-id=158 bgcolor=#d6d6d6
| 461158 ||  || — || April 2, 2006 || Kitt Peak || Spacewatch || — || align=right | 4.9 km || 
|-id=159 bgcolor=#d6d6d6
| 461159 ||  || — || February 6, 2011 || Kitt Peak || Spacewatch || — || align=right | 2.6 km || 
|-id=160 bgcolor=#d6d6d6
| 461160 ||  || — || January 5, 2002 || Kitt Peak || Spacewatch || — || align=right | 2.8 km || 
|-id=161 bgcolor=#d6d6d6
| 461161 ||  || — || April 11, 2008 || Kitt Peak || Spacewatch || — || align=right | 2.9 km || 
|-id=162 bgcolor=#d6d6d6
| 461162 ||  || — || April 4, 2008 || Mount Lemmon || Mount Lemmon Survey || — || align=right | 2.2 km || 
|-id=163 bgcolor=#d6d6d6
| 461163 ||  || — || October 27, 2005 || Catalina || CSS || — || align=right | 2.6 km || 
|-id=164 bgcolor=#fefefe
| 461164 ||  || — || February 27, 2006 || Kitt Peak || Spacewatch || — || align=right data-sort-value="0.91" | 910 m || 
|-id=165 bgcolor=#d6d6d6
| 461165 ||  || — || January 28, 2006 || Mount Lemmon || Mount Lemmon Survey || — || align=right | 2.2 km || 
|-id=166 bgcolor=#d6d6d6
| 461166 ||  || — || July 28, 2009 || Kitt Peak || Spacewatch || — || align=right | 2.2 km || 
|-id=167 bgcolor=#d6d6d6
| 461167 ||  || — || December 10, 2010 || Kitt Peak || Spacewatch || — || align=right | 3.5 km || 
|-id=168 bgcolor=#fefefe
| 461168 ||  || — || December 2, 2004 || Kitt Peak || Spacewatch || — || align=right | 1.2 km || 
|-id=169 bgcolor=#fefefe
| 461169 ||  || — || August 23, 2004 || Kitt Peak || Spacewatch || — || align=right data-sort-value="0.71" | 710 m || 
|-id=170 bgcolor=#d6d6d6
| 461170 ||  || — || January 23, 2006 || Catalina || CSS || — || align=right | 3.2 km || 
|-id=171 bgcolor=#d6d6d6
| 461171 ||  || — || December 21, 2005 || Kitt Peak || Spacewatch || — || align=right | 2.7 km || 
|-id=172 bgcolor=#E9E9E9
| 461172 ||  || — || January 17, 2004 || Kitt Peak || Spacewatch || — || align=right data-sort-value="0.78" | 780 m || 
|-id=173 bgcolor=#E9E9E9
| 461173 ||  || — || September 15, 2006 || Kitt Peak || Spacewatch || — || align=right | 1.7 km || 
|-id=174 bgcolor=#d6d6d6
| 461174 ||  || — || September 29, 2003 || Kitt Peak || Spacewatch || — || align=right | 5.3 km || 
|-id=175 bgcolor=#d6d6d6
| 461175 ||  || — || January 16, 2010 || WISE || WISE || — || align=right | 3.0 km || 
|-id=176 bgcolor=#d6d6d6
| 461176 ||  || — || April 25, 2007 || Mount Lemmon || Mount Lemmon Survey || — || align=right | 3.7 km || 
|-id=177 bgcolor=#fefefe
| 461177 ||  || — || October 10, 2004 || Kitt Peak || Spacewatch || — || align=right data-sort-value="0.90" | 900 m || 
|-id=178 bgcolor=#E9E9E9
| 461178 ||  || — || February 14, 2008 || Catalina || CSS || — || align=right | 1.5 km || 
|-id=179 bgcolor=#d6d6d6
| 461179 ||  || — || December 14, 2004 || Campo Imperatore || CINEOS || — || align=right | 3.3 km || 
|-id=180 bgcolor=#E9E9E9
| 461180 ||  || — || March 11, 2008 || Mount Lemmon || Mount Lemmon Survey || — || align=right | 1.6 km || 
|-id=181 bgcolor=#d6d6d6
| 461181 ||  || — || January 22, 2006 || Anderson Mesa || LONEOS || EOS || align=right | 2.7 km || 
|-id=182 bgcolor=#d6d6d6
| 461182 ||  || — || August 28, 2009 || Kitt Peak || Spacewatch || — || align=right | 2.3 km || 
|-id=183 bgcolor=#d6d6d6
| 461183 ||  || — || December 3, 2004 || Kitt Peak || Spacewatch || — || align=right | 4.5 km || 
|-id=184 bgcolor=#E9E9E9
| 461184 ||  || — || September 15, 2007 || Mount Lemmon || Mount Lemmon Survey || — || align=right | 1.1 km || 
|-id=185 bgcolor=#E9E9E9
| 461185 ||  || — || April 30, 2009 || Kitt Peak || Spacewatch || — || align=right | 2.0 km || 
|-id=186 bgcolor=#d6d6d6
| 461186 ||  || — || April 1, 2012 || Mount Lemmon || Mount Lemmon Survey || EOS || align=right | 1.7 km || 
|-id=187 bgcolor=#fefefe
| 461187 ||  || — || November 3, 2008 || Mount Lemmon || Mount Lemmon Survey || — || align=right data-sort-value="0.67" | 670 m || 
|-id=188 bgcolor=#fefefe
| 461188 ||  || — || September 25, 2000 || Socorro || LINEAR || — || align=right data-sort-value="0.78" | 780 m || 
|-id=189 bgcolor=#E9E9E9
| 461189 ||  || — || April 20, 2004 || Kitt Peak || Spacewatch || — || align=right | 2.3 km || 
|-id=190 bgcolor=#d6d6d6
| 461190 ||  || — || September 19, 2009 || Kitt Peak || Spacewatch || — || align=right | 3.1 km || 
|-id=191 bgcolor=#E9E9E9
| 461191 ||  || — || December 4, 2007 || Kitt Peak || Spacewatch || — || align=right data-sort-value="0.82" | 820 m || 
|-id=192 bgcolor=#d6d6d6
| 461192 ||  || — || October 21, 2003 || Kitt Peak || Spacewatch || — || align=right | 4.1 km || 
|-id=193 bgcolor=#d6d6d6
| 461193 ||  || — || December 26, 2005 || Kitt Peak || Spacewatch || — || align=right | 2.3 km || 
|-id=194 bgcolor=#d6d6d6
| 461194 ||  || — || December 6, 2005 || Kitt Peak || Spacewatch || — || align=right | 2.4 km || 
|-id=195 bgcolor=#d6d6d6
| 461195 ||  || — || April 7, 2008 || Kitt Peak || Spacewatch || — || align=right | 2.6 km || 
|-id=196 bgcolor=#d6d6d6
| 461196 ||  || — || September 18, 2009 || Mount Lemmon || Mount Lemmon Survey || — || align=right | 2.1 km || 
|-id=197 bgcolor=#fefefe
| 461197 ||  || — || February 25, 2006 || Kitt Peak || Spacewatch || — || align=right data-sort-value="0.91" | 910 m || 
|-id=198 bgcolor=#E9E9E9
| 461198 ||  || — || October 2, 2006 || Mount Lemmon || Mount Lemmon Survey || MIS || align=right | 2.4 km || 
|-id=199 bgcolor=#d6d6d6
| 461199 ||  || — || May 2, 2008 || Kitt Peak || Spacewatch || EOS || align=right | 2.2 km || 
|-id=200 bgcolor=#E9E9E9
| 461200 ||  || — || February 6, 2008 || Catalina || CSS || — || align=right | 1.7 km || 
|}

461201–461300 

|-bgcolor=#E9E9E9
| 461201 ||  || — || February 28, 2008 || Mount Lemmon || Mount Lemmon Survey || AGN || align=right | 1.3 km || 
|-id=202 bgcolor=#fefefe
| 461202 ||  || — || April 12, 2010 || Mount Lemmon || Mount Lemmon Survey || — || align=right | 1.8 km || 
|-id=203 bgcolor=#fefefe
| 461203 ||  || — || December 1, 1994 || Kitt Peak || Spacewatch || critical || align=right data-sort-value="0.54" | 540 m || 
|-id=204 bgcolor=#E9E9E9
| 461204 ||  || — || November 17, 2011 || Kitt Peak || Spacewatch || (5) || align=right data-sort-value="0.77" | 770 m || 
|-id=205 bgcolor=#d6d6d6
| 461205 ||  || — || December 31, 1999 || Kitt Peak || Spacewatch || — || align=right | 2.4 km || 
|-id=206 bgcolor=#d6d6d6
| 461206 ||  || — || January 5, 2006 || Kitt Peak || Spacewatch || EOS || align=right | 2.0 km || 
|-id=207 bgcolor=#fefefe
| 461207 ||  || — || October 12, 2004 || Kitt Peak || Spacewatch || — || align=right data-sort-value="0.64" | 640 m || 
|-id=208 bgcolor=#E9E9E9
| 461208 ||  || — || November 7, 2002 || Socorro || LINEAR || — || align=right | 1.5 km || 
|-id=209 bgcolor=#d6d6d6
| 461209 ||  || — || October 23, 2004 || Kitt Peak || Spacewatch || — || align=right | 3.9 km || 
|-id=210 bgcolor=#fefefe
| 461210 ||  || — || November 4, 2004 || Kitt Peak || Spacewatch || — || align=right data-sort-value="0.95" | 950 m || 
|-id=211 bgcolor=#d6d6d6
| 461211 ||  || — || October 10, 2004 || Socorro || LINEAR || EOS || align=right | 2.5 km || 
|-id=212 bgcolor=#d6d6d6
| 461212 ||  || — || November 5, 2010 || Kitt Peak || Spacewatch || — || align=right | 2.6 km || 
|-id=213 bgcolor=#d6d6d6
| 461213 ||  || — || May 9, 2007 || Anderson Mesa || LONEOS || — || align=right | 3.5 km || 
|-id=214 bgcolor=#d6d6d6
| 461214 ||  || — || December 18, 2004 || Mount Lemmon || Mount Lemmon Survey || — || align=right | 3.4 km || 
|-id=215 bgcolor=#d6d6d6
| 461215 ||  || — || April 13, 2013 || Kitt Peak || Spacewatch || — || align=right | 3.0 km || 
|-id=216 bgcolor=#E9E9E9
| 461216 ||  || — || November 14, 2006 || Kitt Peak || Spacewatch || — || align=right | 2.0 km || 
|-id=217 bgcolor=#E9E9E9
| 461217 ||  || — || June 6, 2005 || Kitt Peak || Spacewatch || — || align=right | 2.0 km || 
|-id=218 bgcolor=#d6d6d6
| 461218 ||  || — || December 8, 2004 || Socorro || LINEAR || — || align=right | 3.0 km || 
|-id=219 bgcolor=#fefefe
| 461219 ||  || — || January 18, 2009 || Kitt Peak || Spacewatch || — || align=right data-sort-value="0.77" | 770 m || 
|-id=220 bgcolor=#fefefe
| 461220 ||  || — || January 20, 2002 || Kitt Peak || Spacewatch || — || align=right | 1.0 km || 
|-id=221 bgcolor=#d6d6d6
| 461221 ||  || — || September 18, 2009 || Kitt Peak || Spacewatch || — || align=right | 3.5 km || 
|-id=222 bgcolor=#d6d6d6
| 461222 ||  || — || October 8, 2007 || Mount Lemmon || Mount Lemmon Survey || 3:2critical || align=right | 3.4 km || 
|-id=223 bgcolor=#fefefe
| 461223 ||  || — || October 6, 2008 || Mount Lemmon || Mount Lemmon Survey || — || align=right | 1.4 km || 
|-id=224 bgcolor=#d6d6d6
| 461224 ||  || — || September 28, 2003 || Anderson Mesa || LONEOS || TIR || align=right | 4.0 km || 
|-id=225 bgcolor=#E9E9E9
| 461225 ||  || — || September 20, 2006 || Kitt Peak || Spacewatch || — || align=right | 1.1 km || 
|-id=226 bgcolor=#E9E9E9
| 461226 ||  || — || January 19, 2004 || Anderson Mesa || LONEOS || (5) || align=right data-sort-value="0.85" | 850 m || 
|-id=227 bgcolor=#d6d6d6
| 461227 ||  || — || March 3, 2000 || Socorro || LINEAR || — || align=right | 3.9 km || 
|-id=228 bgcolor=#E9E9E9
| 461228 ||  || — || April 4, 2005 || Mount Lemmon || Mount Lemmon Survey || — || align=right | 1.1 km || 
|-id=229 bgcolor=#d6d6d6
| 461229 ||  || — || August 27, 2009 || Catalina || CSS || — || align=right | 3.5 km || 
|-id=230 bgcolor=#d6d6d6
| 461230 ||  || — || September 14, 2010 || Kitt Peak || Spacewatch || — || align=right | 2.9 km || 
|-id=231 bgcolor=#d6d6d6
| 461231 ||  || — || December 1, 2010 || Mount Lemmon || Mount Lemmon Survey || — || align=right | 2.8 km || 
|-id=232 bgcolor=#d6d6d6
| 461232 ||  || — || January 27, 2010 || WISE || WISE || — || align=right | 3.0 km || 
|-id=233 bgcolor=#d6d6d6
| 461233 ||  || — || May 10, 2007 || Mount Lemmon || Mount Lemmon Survey || — || align=right | 3.0 km || 
|-id=234 bgcolor=#E9E9E9
| 461234 ||  || — || March 29, 2009 || Siding Spring || SSS || JUN || align=right | 1.6 km || 
|-id=235 bgcolor=#d6d6d6
| 461235 ||  || — || September 10, 2004 || Kitt Peak || Spacewatch || — || align=right | 2.2 km || 
|-id=236 bgcolor=#d6d6d6
| 461236 ||  || — || November 20, 2004 || Kitt Peak || Spacewatch || — || align=right | 3.0 km || 
|-id=237 bgcolor=#fefefe
| 461237 ||  || — || January 16, 2009 || Kitt Peak || Spacewatch || NYS || align=right data-sort-value="0.66" | 660 m || 
|-id=238 bgcolor=#E9E9E9
| 461238 ||  || — || January 26, 2004 || Anderson Mesa || LONEOS || — || align=right | 1.1 km || 
|-id=239 bgcolor=#fefefe
| 461239 ||  || — || December 11, 2004 || Socorro || LINEAR || — || align=right data-sort-value="0.80" | 800 m || 
|-id=240 bgcolor=#d6d6d6
| 461240 ||  || — || August 31, 2005 || Kitt Peak || Spacewatch || KOR || align=right | 1.3 km || 
|-id=241 bgcolor=#fefefe
| 461241 ||  || — || December 18, 2004 || Mount Lemmon || Mount Lemmon Survey || NYS || align=right data-sort-value="0.63" | 630 m || 
|-id=242 bgcolor=#d6d6d6
| 461242 ||  || — || November 20, 2009 || Mount Lemmon || Mount Lemmon Survey || Tj (2.99) || align=right | 3.3 km || 
|-id=243 bgcolor=#E9E9E9
| 461243 ||  || — || March 4, 2008 || Mount Lemmon || Mount Lemmon Survey || — || align=right | 1.3 km || 
|-id=244 bgcolor=#E9E9E9
| 461244 ||  || — || November 9, 2001 || Socorro || LINEAR || — || align=right | 1.9 km || 
|-id=245 bgcolor=#fefefe
| 461245 ||  || — || December 5, 1997 || Caussols || ODAS || — || align=right | 1.2 km || 
|-id=246 bgcolor=#fefefe
| 461246 ||  || — || December 21, 2004 || Catalina || CSS || — || align=right data-sort-value="0.87" | 870 m || 
|-id=247 bgcolor=#fefefe
| 461247 ||  || — || September 21, 2004 || Anderson Mesa || LONEOS || — || align=right | 1.00 km || 
|-id=248 bgcolor=#d6d6d6
| 461248 ||  || — || December 28, 2005 || Kitt Peak || Spacewatch || — || align=right | 2.4 km || 
|-id=249 bgcolor=#fefefe
| 461249 ||  || — || November 18, 2004 || Campo Imperatore || CINEOS || MAS || align=right data-sort-value="0.74" | 740 m || 
|-id=250 bgcolor=#d6d6d6
| 461250 ||  || — || September 25, 2009 || Catalina || CSS || EOS || align=right | 2.3 km || 
|-id=251 bgcolor=#d6d6d6
| 461251 ||  || — || December 31, 2005 || Kitt Peak || Spacewatch || — || align=right | 2.8 km || 
|-id=252 bgcolor=#E9E9E9
| 461252 ||  || — || November 13, 2007 || Mount Lemmon || Mount Lemmon Survey || — || align=right | 1.1 km || 
|-id=253 bgcolor=#d6d6d6
| 461253 ||  || — || November 14, 1998 || Kitt Peak || Spacewatch || VER || align=right | 2.5 km || 
|-id=254 bgcolor=#d6d6d6
| 461254 ||  || — || April 18, 2007 || Mount Lemmon || Mount Lemmon Survey || — || align=right | 3.5 km || 
|-id=255 bgcolor=#d6d6d6
| 461255 ||  || — || September 30, 2009 || Mount Lemmon || Mount Lemmon Survey || — || align=right | 3.0 km || 
|-id=256 bgcolor=#d6d6d6
| 461256 ||  || — || November 7, 2010 || Mount Lemmon || Mount Lemmon Survey || — || align=right | 4.7 km || 
|-id=257 bgcolor=#d6d6d6
| 461257 ||  || — || December 6, 2005 || Mount Lemmon || Mount Lemmon Survey || EOS || align=right | 1.6 km || 
|-id=258 bgcolor=#d6d6d6
| 461258 ||  || — || November 8, 2010 || Kitt Peak || Spacewatch || EOS || align=right | 1.6 km || 
|-id=259 bgcolor=#d6d6d6
| 461259 ||  || — || January 8, 2011 || Mount Lemmon || Mount Lemmon Survey || — || align=right | 3.3 km || 
|-id=260 bgcolor=#d6d6d6
| 461260 ||  || — || October 13, 2004 || Kitt Peak || Spacewatch || — || align=right | 2.2 km || 
|-id=261 bgcolor=#d6d6d6
| 461261 ||  || — || September 16, 2009 || Kitt Peak || Spacewatch || — || align=right | 2.6 km || 
|-id=262 bgcolor=#fefefe
| 461262 ||  || — || April 12, 2002 || Socorro || LINEAR || — || align=right | 1.0 km || 
|-id=263 bgcolor=#d6d6d6
| 461263 ||  || — || April 13, 2013 || Kitt Peak || Spacewatch || — || align=right | 3.1 km || 
|-id=264 bgcolor=#d6d6d6
| 461264 ||  || — || December 5, 2010 || Mount Lemmon || Mount Lemmon Survey || — || align=right | 3.4 km || 
|-id=265 bgcolor=#d6d6d6
| 461265 ||  || — || September 18, 2003 || Kitt Peak || Spacewatch || — || align=right | 3.2 km || 
|-id=266 bgcolor=#E9E9E9
| 461266 ||  || — || March 5, 2008 || Kitt Peak || Spacewatch || AGN || align=right data-sort-value="0.94" | 940 m || 
|-id=267 bgcolor=#E9E9E9
| 461267 ||  || — || March 6, 2008 || Mount Lemmon || Mount Lemmon Survey || — || align=right | 1.7 km || 
|-id=268 bgcolor=#E9E9E9
| 461268 ||  || — || March 4, 2008 || Mount Lemmon || Mount Lemmon Survey || — || align=right | 2.1 km || 
|-id=269 bgcolor=#d6d6d6
| 461269 ||  || — || September 29, 2009 || Mount Lemmon || Mount Lemmon Survey || — || align=right | 5.0 km || 
|-id=270 bgcolor=#d6d6d6
| 461270 ||  || — || May 7, 2013 || Mount Lemmon || Mount Lemmon Survey || EOS || align=right | 1.9 km || 
|-id=271 bgcolor=#fefefe
| 461271 ||  || — || June 25, 2011 || Mount Lemmon || Mount Lemmon Survey || (2076) || align=right data-sort-value="0.81" | 810 m || 
|-id=272 bgcolor=#d6d6d6
| 461272 ||  || — || September 29, 2003 || Kitt Peak || Spacewatch || — || align=right | 2.9 km || 
|-id=273 bgcolor=#E9E9E9
| 461273 ||  || — || January 18, 2008 || Mount Lemmon || Mount Lemmon Survey || — || align=right | 1.3 km || 
|-id=274 bgcolor=#d6d6d6
| 461274 ||  || — || September 16, 2009 || Catalina || CSS || — || align=right | 3.9 km || 
|-id=275 bgcolor=#fefefe
| 461275 ||  || — || January 19, 2005 || Kitt Peak || Spacewatch || — || align=right data-sort-value="0.85" | 850 m || 
|-id=276 bgcolor=#d6d6d6
| 461276 ||  || — || October 9, 2004 || Kitt Peak || Spacewatch || — || align=right | 2.7 km || 
|-id=277 bgcolor=#E9E9E9
| 461277 ||  || — || August 18, 2006 || Anderson Mesa || LONEOS || — || align=right | 1.4 km || 
|-id=278 bgcolor=#fefefe
| 461278 ||  || — || February 1, 2009 || Kitt Peak || Spacewatch || — || align=right data-sort-value="0.86" | 860 m || 
|-id=279 bgcolor=#d6d6d6
| 461279 ||  || — || January 19, 2010 || WISE || WISE || VER || align=right | 3.5 km || 
|-id=280 bgcolor=#E9E9E9
| 461280 ||  || — || October 22, 2006 || Kitt Peak || Spacewatch || — || align=right | 1.9 km || 
|-id=281 bgcolor=#E9E9E9
| 461281 ||  || — || May 16, 2005 || Mount Lemmon || Mount Lemmon Survey || — || align=right | 2.0 km || 
|-id=282 bgcolor=#fefefe
| 461282 ||  || — || November 28, 1994 || Kitt Peak || Spacewatch || — || align=right data-sort-value="0.94" | 940 m || 
|-id=283 bgcolor=#d6d6d6
| 461283 ||  || — || December 31, 2005 || Kitt Peak || Spacewatch || — || align=right | 2.5 km || 
|-id=284 bgcolor=#d6d6d6
| 461284 ||  || — || March 25, 2012 || Mount Lemmon || Mount Lemmon Survey || EOS || align=right | 2.2 km || 
|-id=285 bgcolor=#fefefe
| 461285 ||  || — || November 4, 2004 || Kitt Peak || Spacewatch || — || align=right data-sort-value="0.83" | 830 m || 
|-id=286 bgcolor=#fefefe
| 461286 ||  || — || December 1, 2005 || Kitt Peak || Spacewatch || — || align=right data-sort-value="0.75" | 750 m || 
|-id=287 bgcolor=#fefefe
| 461287 ||  || — || October 31, 2008 || Kitt Peak || Spacewatch || — || align=right data-sort-value="0.70" | 700 m || 
|-id=288 bgcolor=#d6d6d6
| 461288 ||  || — || January 23, 2006 || Kitt Peak || Spacewatch || — || align=right | 3.2 km || 
|-id=289 bgcolor=#d6d6d6
| 461289 ||  || — || January 24, 1996 || Kitt Peak || Spacewatch || EOS || align=right | 2.1 km || 
|-id=290 bgcolor=#d6d6d6
| 461290 ||  || — || January 28, 2006 || Mount Lemmon || Mount Lemmon Survey || EOS || align=right | 2.2 km || 
|-id=291 bgcolor=#E9E9E9
| 461291 ||  || — || January 19, 2012 || Mount Lemmon || Mount Lemmon Survey || — || align=right | 1.9 km || 
|-id=292 bgcolor=#E9E9E9
| 461292 ||  || — || August 10, 2010 || Kitt Peak || Spacewatch || — || align=right | 1.6 km || 
|-id=293 bgcolor=#fefefe
| 461293 ||  || — || December 20, 2009 || Mount Lemmon || Mount Lemmon Survey || — || align=right data-sort-value="0.76" | 760 m || 
|-id=294 bgcolor=#E9E9E9
| 461294 ||  || — || January 30, 2008 || Mount Lemmon || Mount Lemmon Survey || — || align=right | 1.4 km || 
|-id=295 bgcolor=#d6d6d6
| 461295 ||  || — || December 19, 2004 || Kitt Peak || Spacewatch || — || align=right | 3.2 km || 
|-id=296 bgcolor=#d6d6d6
| 461296 ||  || — || December 9, 2004 || Kitt Peak || Spacewatch || — || align=right | 3.9 km || 
|-id=297 bgcolor=#d6d6d6
| 461297 ||  || — || June 13, 2008 || Kitt Peak || Spacewatch || — || align=right | 3.0 km || 
|-id=298 bgcolor=#d6d6d6
| 461298 ||  || — || April 26, 2006 || Kitt Peak || Spacewatch || — || align=right | 4.2 km || 
|-id=299 bgcolor=#d6d6d6
| 461299 ||  || — || November 11, 2010 || Mount Lemmon || Mount Lemmon Survey || — || align=right | 2.0 km || 
|-id=300 bgcolor=#E9E9E9
| 461300 ||  || — || December 14, 2006 || Kitt Peak || Spacewatch || AGN || align=right | 1.1 km || 
|}

461301–461400 

|-bgcolor=#fefefe
| 461301 ||  || — || March 10, 2005 || Mount Lemmon || Mount Lemmon Survey || — || align=right data-sort-value="0.79" | 790 m || 
|-id=302 bgcolor=#E9E9E9
| 461302 ||  || — || October 2, 2010 || Kitt Peak || Spacewatch || AST || align=right | 1.3 km || 
|-id=303 bgcolor=#E9E9E9
| 461303 ||  || — || April 14, 2004 || Kitt Peak || Spacewatch || — || align=right | 2.1 km || 
|-id=304 bgcolor=#fefefe
| 461304 ||  || — || February 27, 2006 || Kitt Peak || Spacewatch || — || align=right data-sort-value="0.63" | 630 m || 
|-id=305 bgcolor=#E9E9E9
| 461305 ||  || — || March 12, 2008 || Mount Lemmon || Mount Lemmon Survey || HOF || align=right | 2.5 km || 
|-id=306 bgcolor=#fefefe
| 461306 ||  || — || October 8, 2007 || Mount Lemmon || Mount Lemmon Survey || — || align=right data-sort-value="0.75" | 750 m || 
|-id=307 bgcolor=#d6d6d6
| 461307 ||  || — || March 14, 2010 || WISE || WISE || — || align=right | 2.7 km || 
|-id=308 bgcolor=#d6d6d6
| 461308 ||  || — || December 15, 2004 || Kitt Peak || Spacewatch || — || align=right | 2.7 km || 
|-id=309 bgcolor=#E9E9E9
| 461309 ||  || — || December 15, 2006 || Kitt Peak || Spacewatch || — || align=right | 2.3 km || 
|-id=310 bgcolor=#d6d6d6
| 461310 ||  || — || December 2, 2010 || Mount Lemmon || Mount Lemmon Survey || EOS || align=right | 1.9 km || 
|-id=311 bgcolor=#E9E9E9
| 461311 ||  || — || July 13, 2010 || Kitt Peak || Spacewatch || — || align=right | 2.8 km || 
|-id=312 bgcolor=#d6d6d6
| 461312 ||  || — || December 3, 2010 || Kitt Peak || Spacewatch || — || align=right | 3.2 km || 
|-id=313 bgcolor=#E9E9E9
| 461313 ||  || — || February 29, 2008 || Kitt Peak || Spacewatch || WIT || align=right | 1.1 km || 
|-id=314 bgcolor=#fefefe
| 461314 ||  || — || January 2, 2009 || Mount Lemmon || Mount Lemmon Survey || V || align=right data-sort-value="0.66" | 660 m || 
|-id=315 bgcolor=#E9E9E9
| 461315 ||  || — || June 27, 2005 || Mount Lemmon || Mount Lemmon Survey || — || align=right | 1.3 km || 
|-id=316 bgcolor=#E9E9E9
| 461316 ||  || — || January 19, 2004 || Kitt Peak || Spacewatch || — || align=right data-sort-value="0.87" | 870 m || 
|-id=317 bgcolor=#d6d6d6
| 461317 ||  || — || October 1, 2003 || Kitt Peak || Spacewatch || critical || align=right | 2.9 km || 
|-id=318 bgcolor=#fefefe
| 461318 ||  || — || January 6, 2005 || Socorro || LINEAR || MAS || align=right data-sort-value="0.76" | 760 m || 
|-id=319 bgcolor=#d6d6d6
| 461319 ||  || — || September 19, 2009 || Mount Lemmon || Mount Lemmon Survey || — || align=right | 2.1 km || 
|-id=320 bgcolor=#d6d6d6
| 461320 ||  || — || November 26, 2005 || Kitt Peak || Spacewatch || — || align=right | 1.7 km || 
|-id=321 bgcolor=#d6d6d6
| 461321 ||  || — || December 9, 2004 || Kitt Peak || Spacewatch || — || align=right | 2.5 km || 
|-id=322 bgcolor=#d6d6d6
| 461322 ||  || — || November 18, 2009 || Catalina || CSS || — || align=right | 3.9 km || 
|-id=323 bgcolor=#E9E9E9
| 461323 ||  || — || November 6, 2010 || Mount Lemmon || Mount Lemmon Survey || — || align=right | 2.5 km || 
|-id=324 bgcolor=#fefefe
| 461324 ||  || — || October 15, 2004 || Mount Lemmon || Mount Lemmon Survey || — || align=right | 1.4 km || 
|-id=325 bgcolor=#d6d6d6
| 461325 ||  || — || November 20, 2000 || Kitt Peak || Spacewatch || — || align=right | 2.5 km || 
|-id=326 bgcolor=#E9E9E9
| 461326 ||  || — || May 16, 2009 || Kitt Peak || Spacewatch || — || align=right | 2.0 km || 
|-id=327 bgcolor=#fefefe
| 461327 ||  || — || February 20, 2006 || Kitt Peak || Spacewatch || — || align=right data-sort-value="0.86" | 860 m || 
|-id=328 bgcolor=#d6d6d6
| 461328 ||  || — || December 5, 2005 || Mount Lemmon || Mount Lemmon Survey || KOR || align=right | 1.2 km || 
|-id=329 bgcolor=#E9E9E9
| 461329 ||  || — || August 31, 2005 || Kitt Peak || Spacewatch || AGN || align=right data-sort-value="0.91" | 910 m || 
|-id=330 bgcolor=#d6d6d6
| 461330 ||  || — || October 31, 2005 || Mount Lemmon || Mount Lemmon Survey || — || align=right | 2.4 km || 
|-id=331 bgcolor=#d6d6d6
| 461331 ||  || — || December 18, 2004 || Mount Lemmon || Mount Lemmon Survey || — || align=right | 3.1 km || 
|-id=332 bgcolor=#E9E9E9
| 461332 ||  || — || January 10, 2008 || Mount Lemmon || Mount Lemmon Survey || — || align=right | 1.2 km || 
|-id=333 bgcolor=#E9E9E9
| 461333 ||  || — || August 30, 2005 || Kitt Peak || Spacewatch || AGN || align=right data-sort-value="0.99" | 990 m || 
|-id=334 bgcolor=#E9E9E9
| 461334 ||  || — || February 12, 2004 || Kitt Peak || Spacewatch || (5) || align=right data-sort-value="0.77" | 770 m || 
|-id=335 bgcolor=#E9E9E9
| 461335 ||  || — || March 28, 2008 || Mount Lemmon || Mount Lemmon Survey || — || align=right | 1.8 km || 
|-id=336 bgcolor=#d6d6d6
| 461336 ||  || — || December 8, 1999 || Kitt Peak || Spacewatch || — || align=right | 2.9 km || 
|-id=337 bgcolor=#E9E9E9
| 461337 ||  || — || September 29, 2005 || Mount Lemmon || Mount Lemmon Survey || — || align=right | 2.2 km || 
|-id=338 bgcolor=#fefefe
| 461338 ||  || — || January 11, 2005 || Socorro || LINEAR || — || align=right data-sort-value="0.97" | 970 m || 
|-id=339 bgcolor=#fefefe
| 461339 || 6365 P-L || — || September 24, 1960 || Palomar || PLS || — || align=right data-sort-value="0.67" | 670 m || 
|-id=340 bgcolor=#E9E9E9
| 461340 ||  || — || September 30, 1973 || Palomar || PLS || critical || align=right data-sort-value="0.71" | 710 m || 
|-id=341 bgcolor=#E9E9E9
| 461341 ||  || — || September 20, 1995 || Kitt Peak || Spacewatch || — || align=right | 1.5 km || 
|-id=342 bgcolor=#fefefe
| 461342 ||  || — || September 25, 1995 || Kitt Peak || Spacewatch || MAS || align=right data-sort-value="0.58" | 580 m || 
|-id=343 bgcolor=#E9E9E9
| 461343 ||  || — || September 20, 1995 || Kitt Peak || Spacewatch || HOF || align=right | 2.1 km || 
|-id=344 bgcolor=#E9E9E9
| 461344 ||  || — || September 21, 1995 || Kitt Peak || Spacewatch || — || align=right | 1.9 km || 
|-id=345 bgcolor=#E9E9E9
| 461345 ||  || — || October 21, 1995 || Kitt Peak || Spacewatch || — || align=right | 2.1 km || 
|-id=346 bgcolor=#fefefe
| 461346 ||  || — || October 22, 1995 || Kitt Peak || Spacewatch || NYS || align=right data-sort-value="0.60" | 600 m || 
|-id=347 bgcolor=#fefefe
| 461347 ||  || — || October 17, 1995 || Kitt Peak || Spacewatch || — || align=right | 1.1 km || 
|-id=348 bgcolor=#E9E9E9
| 461348 ||  || — || November 16, 1995 || Kitt Peak || Spacewatch || — || align=right | 2.4 km || 
|-id=349 bgcolor=#d6d6d6
| 461349 ||  || — || September 28, 1997 || Kitt Peak || Spacewatch || EOS || align=right | 2.1 km || 
|-id=350 bgcolor=#d6d6d6
| 461350 || 1998 PY || — || August 14, 1998 || Woomera || F. B. Zoltowski || — || align=right | 2.6 km || 
|-id=351 bgcolor=#C2FFFF
| 461351 ||  || — || October 12, 1998 || Kitt Peak || Spacewatch || L4 || align=right | 9.9 km || 
|-id=352 bgcolor=#fefefe
| 461352 ||  || — || March 20, 1999 || Apache Point || SDSS || — || align=right data-sort-value="0.96" | 960 m || 
|-id=353 bgcolor=#FFC2E0
| 461353 ||  || — || June 8, 1999 || Socorro || LINEAR || APOcritical || align=right data-sort-value="0.25" | 250 m || 
|-id=354 bgcolor=#fefefe
| 461354 ||  || — || October 31, 1999 || Kitt Peak || Spacewatch || MAS || align=right data-sort-value="0.74" | 740 m || 
|-id=355 bgcolor=#fefefe
| 461355 ||  || — || October 20, 1999 || Kitt Peak || Spacewatch || — || align=right data-sort-value="0.68" | 680 m || 
|-id=356 bgcolor=#FA8072
| 461356 ||  || — || October 14, 1999 || Socorro || LINEAR || H || align=right data-sort-value="0.79" | 790 m || 
|-id=357 bgcolor=#d6d6d6
| 461357 ||  || — || January 4, 2000 || Kitt Peak || Spacewatch || — || align=right | 2.0 km || 
|-id=358 bgcolor=#d6d6d6
| 461358 ||  || — || January 16, 2000 || Kitt Peak || Spacewatch || — || align=right | 3.5 km || 
|-id=359 bgcolor=#fefefe
| 461359 ||  || — || February 5, 2000 || Kitt Peak || Spacewatch || — || align=right data-sort-value="0.62" | 620 m || 
|-id=360 bgcolor=#fefefe
| 461360 ||  || — || March 3, 2000 || Kitt Peak || Spacewatch || — || align=right | 1.3 km || 
|-id=361 bgcolor=#E9E9E9
| 461361 ||  || — || March 30, 2000 || Kitt Peak || Spacewatch || — || align=right data-sort-value="0.56" | 560 m || 
|-id=362 bgcolor=#d6d6d6
| 461362 ||  || — || March 29, 2000 || Kitt Peak || Spacewatch || — || align=right | 2.9 km || 
|-id=363 bgcolor=#C7FF8F
| 461363 ||  || — || April 5, 2000 || Socorro || LINEAR || Tj (2.9) || align=right | 9.8 km || 
|-id=364 bgcolor=#d6d6d6
| 461364 ||  || — || April 24, 2000 || Kitt Peak || Spacewatch || — || align=right | 3.8 km || 
|-id=365 bgcolor=#FFC2E0
| 461365 ||  || — || May 6, 2000 || Socorro || LINEAR || AMOcritical || align=right data-sort-value="0.54" | 540 m || 
|-id=366 bgcolor=#E9E9E9
| 461366 ||  || — || May 29, 2000 || Kitt Peak || Spacewatch || RAF || align=right data-sort-value="0.88" | 880 m || 
|-id=367 bgcolor=#FA8072
| 461367 ||  || — || August 31, 2000 || Socorro || LINEAR || — || align=right data-sort-value="0.81" | 810 m || 
|-id=368 bgcolor=#E9E9E9
| 461368 ||  || — || September 3, 2000 || Apache Point || SDSS || — || align=right | 1.9 km || 
|-id=369 bgcolor=#FA8072
| 461369 ||  || — || September 23, 2000 || Socorro || LINEAR || — || align=right data-sort-value="0.98" | 980 m || 
|-id=370 bgcolor=#E9E9E9
| 461370 ||  || — || September 24, 2000 || Socorro || LINEAR || — || align=right | 2.0 km || 
|-id=371 bgcolor=#FA8072
| 461371 ||  || — || September 5, 2000 || Socorro || LINEAR || — || align=right data-sort-value="0.95" | 950 m || 
|-id=372 bgcolor=#E9E9E9
| 461372 ||  || — || September 28, 2000 || Kitt Peak || Spacewatch || — || align=right | 1.6 km || 
|-id=373 bgcolor=#E9E9E9
| 461373 ||  || — || October 1, 2000 || Anderson Mesa || LONEOS || — || align=right | 1.4 km || 
|-id=374 bgcolor=#FA8072
| 461374 ||  || — || September 29, 2000 || Anderson Mesa || LONEOS || — || align=right data-sort-value="0.78" | 780 m || 
|-id=375 bgcolor=#d6d6d6
| 461375 ||  || — || March 17, 2001 || Socorro || LINEAR || — || align=right | 3.6 km || 
|-id=376 bgcolor=#fefefe
| 461376 ||  || — || March 29, 2001 || Kitt Peak || Spacewatch || — || align=right data-sort-value="0.68" | 680 m || 
|-id=377 bgcolor=#FA8072
| 461377 ||  || — || March 27, 2001 || Haleakala || NEAT || — || align=right data-sort-value="0.45" | 450 m || 
|-id=378 bgcolor=#fefefe
| 461378 ||  || — || March 21, 2001 || Haleakala || NEAT || — || align=right data-sort-value="0.93" | 930 m || 
|-id=379 bgcolor=#d6d6d6
| 461379 ||  || — || March 21, 2001 || Kitt Peak || SKADS || KOR || align=right | 1.2 km || 
|-id=380 bgcolor=#fefefe
| 461380 ||  || — || March 21, 2001 || Kitt Peak || SKADS || — || align=right data-sort-value="0.74" | 740 m || 
|-id=381 bgcolor=#fefefe
| 461381 || 2001 HS || — || April 17, 2001 || Saint-Véran || Saint-Véran Obs. || MAS || align=right data-sort-value="0.90" | 900 m || 
|-id=382 bgcolor=#E9E9E9
| 461382 ||  || — || June 26, 2001 || Palomar || NEAT || — || align=right | 1.5 km || 
|-id=383 bgcolor=#E9E9E9
| 461383 ||  || — || July 18, 2001 || Palomar || NEAT || — || align=right | 1.1 km || 
|-id=384 bgcolor=#d6d6d6
| 461384 ||  || — || July 21, 2001 || Palomar || NEAT || — || align=right | 3.4 km || 
|-id=385 bgcolor=#E9E9E9
| 461385 ||  || — || July 27, 2001 || Anderson Mesa || LONEOS || — || align=right | 1.8 km || 
|-id=386 bgcolor=#E9E9E9
| 461386 ||  || — || August 10, 2001 || Palomar || NEAT || — || align=right | 1.1 km || 
|-id=387 bgcolor=#d6d6d6
| 461387 ||  || — || August 22, 2001 || Socorro || LINEAR || — || align=right | 3.6 km || 
|-id=388 bgcolor=#E9E9E9
| 461388 ||  || — || September 7, 2001 || Socorro || LINEAR || — || align=right | 1.0 km || 
|-id=389 bgcolor=#E9E9E9
| 461389 ||  || — || September 12, 2001 || Socorro || LINEAR || — || align=right | 2.3 km || 
|-id=390 bgcolor=#fefefe
| 461390 ||  || — || September 12, 2001 || Socorro || LINEAR || — || align=right data-sort-value="0.71" | 710 m || 
|-id=391 bgcolor=#E9E9E9
| 461391 ||  || — || August 1, 2001 || Palomar || NEAT || — || align=right | 1.2 km || 
|-id=392 bgcolor=#d6d6d6
| 461392 ||  || — || September 11, 2001 || Anderson Mesa || LONEOS || — || align=right | 3.5 km || 
|-id=393 bgcolor=#E9E9E9
| 461393 ||  || — || August 27, 2001 || Palomar || NEAT || — || align=right | 1.4 km || 
|-id=394 bgcolor=#E9E9E9
| 461394 ||  || — || September 16, 2001 || Socorro || LINEAR || — || align=right | 1.3 km || 
|-id=395 bgcolor=#E9E9E9
| 461395 ||  || — || September 17, 2001 || Socorro || LINEAR || — || align=right | 1.9 km || 
|-id=396 bgcolor=#E9E9E9
| 461396 ||  || — || September 16, 2001 || Socorro || LINEAR || critical || align=right data-sort-value="0.94" | 940 m || 
|-id=397 bgcolor=#FFC2E0
| 461397 ||  || — || September 20, 2001 || Socorro || LINEAR || AMO +1km || align=right data-sort-value="0.89" | 890 m || 
|-id=398 bgcolor=#d6d6d6
| 461398 ||  || — || September 19, 2001 || Socorro || LINEAR || Tj (2.98) || align=right | 4.6 km || 
|-id=399 bgcolor=#E9E9E9
| 461399 ||  || — || September 19, 2001 || Socorro || LINEAR || — || align=right | 1.3 km || 
|-id=400 bgcolor=#fefefe
| 461400 ||  || — || September 19, 2001 || Socorro || LINEAR || — || align=right data-sort-value="0.67" | 670 m || 
|}

461401–461500 

|-bgcolor=#E9E9E9
| 461401 ||  || — || September 19, 2001 || Socorro || LINEAR || EUN || align=right | 1.1 km || 
|-id=402 bgcolor=#fefefe
| 461402 ||  || — || September 25, 2001 || Socorro || LINEAR || H || align=right data-sort-value="0.75" | 750 m || 
|-id=403 bgcolor=#fefefe
| 461403 ||  || — || September 21, 2001 || Socorro || LINEAR || H || align=right data-sort-value="0.48" | 480 m || 
|-id=404 bgcolor=#E9E9E9
| 461404 ||  || — || September 19, 2001 || Kitt Peak || Spacewatch || — || align=right | 1.3 km || 
|-id=405 bgcolor=#d6d6d6
| 461405 ||  || — || September 18, 2001 || Kitt Peak || Spacewatch || — || align=right | 3.1 km || 
|-id=406 bgcolor=#E9E9E9
| 461406 ||  || — || September 22, 2001 || Socorro || LINEAR || — || align=right | 1.0 km || 
|-id=407 bgcolor=#E9E9E9
| 461407 ||  || — || September 18, 2001 || Anderson Mesa || LONEOS || — || align=right | 1.5 km || 
|-id=408 bgcolor=#E9E9E9
| 461408 ||  || — || December 18, 2001 || Kitt Peak || Spacewatch || — || align=right | 1.7 km || 
|-id=409 bgcolor=#E9E9E9
| 461409 ||  || — || October 14, 2001 || Socorro || LINEAR || EUN || align=right | 1.1 km || 
|-id=410 bgcolor=#E9E9E9
| 461410 ||  || — || October 14, 2001 || Cima Ekar || ADAS || — || align=right | 1.5 km || 
|-id=411 bgcolor=#fefefe
| 461411 ||  || — || October 14, 2001 || Socorro || LINEAR || H || align=right data-sort-value="0.71" | 710 m || 
|-id=412 bgcolor=#E9E9E9
| 461412 ||  || — || October 14, 2001 || Socorro || LINEAR || EUN || align=right | 1.4 km || 
|-id=413 bgcolor=#E9E9E9
| 461413 ||  || — || October 11, 2001 || Palomar || NEAT || BRG || align=right | 1.4 km || 
|-id=414 bgcolor=#fefefe
| 461414 ||  || — || October 10, 2001 || Palomar || NEAT || H || align=right data-sort-value="0.75" | 750 m || 
|-id=415 bgcolor=#E9E9E9
| 461415 ||  || — || September 16, 2001 || Socorro || LINEAR || — || align=right | 1.7 km || 
|-id=416 bgcolor=#E9E9E9
| 461416 ||  || — || October 14, 2001 || Socorro || LINEAR || (5)critical || align=right data-sort-value="0.85" | 850 m || 
|-id=417 bgcolor=#E9E9E9
| 461417 ||  || — || October 13, 2001 || Palomar || NEAT || — || align=right | 1.7 km || 
|-id=418 bgcolor=#E9E9E9
| 461418 ||  || — || October 13, 2001 || Palomar || NEAT || — || align=right | 1.8 km || 
|-id=419 bgcolor=#FA8072
| 461419 ||  || — || October 16, 2001 || Kleť || M. Tichý || — || align=right | 1.2 km || 
|-id=420 bgcolor=#fefefe
| 461420 ||  || — || October 17, 2001 || Socorro || LINEAR || H || align=right data-sort-value="0.83" | 830 m || 
|-id=421 bgcolor=#E9E9E9
| 461421 ||  || — || October 16, 2001 || Socorro || LINEAR || JUN || align=right | 1.0 km || 
|-id=422 bgcolor=#E9E9E9
| 461422 ||  || — || October 22, 2001 || Socorro || LINEAR || — || align=right | 1.4 km || 
|-id=423 bgcolor=#E9E9E9
| 461423 ||  || — || October 23, 2001 || Palomar || NEAT || — || align=right | 1.3 km || 
|-id=424 bgcolor=#E9E9E9
| 461424 ||  || — || October 19, 2001 || Palomar || NEAT || MAR || align=right data-sort-value="0.99" | 990 m || 
|-id=425 bgcolor=#fefefe
| 461425 ||  || — || October 13, 2001 || Socorro || LINEAR || — || align=right data-sort-value="0.73" | 730 m || 
|-id=426 bgcolor=#E9E9E9
| 461426 ||  || — || October 20, 2001 || Palomar || NEAT || EUN || align=right | 1.1 km || 
|-id=427 bgcolor=#E9E9E9
| 461427 ||  || — || October 16, 2001 || Palomar || NEAT || — || align=right | 1.4 km || 
|-id=428 bgcolor=#E9E9E9
| 461428 ||  || — || November 9, 2001 || Socorro || LINEAR || — || align=right | 1.1 km || 
|-id=429 bgcolor=#fefefe
| 461429 ||  || — || November 10, 2001 || Socorro || LINEAR || H || align=right data-sort-value="0.86" | 860 m || 
|-id=430 bgcolor=#E9E9E9
| 461430 ||  || — || October 21, 2001 || Socorro || LINEAR || JUN || align=right | 1.3 km || 
|-id=431 bgcolor=#E9E9E9
| 461431 ||  || — || November 9, 2001 || Socorro || LINEAR || — || align=right | 2.1 km || 
|-id=432 bgcolor=#FA8072
| 461432 ||  || — || November 26, 2001 || Socorro || LINEAR || — || align=right | 2.9 km || 
|-id=433 bgcolor=#E9E9E9
| 461433 ||  || — || November 9, 2001 || Socorro || LINEAR || — || align=right | 1.8 km || 
|-id=434 bgcolor=#E9E9E9
| 461434 ||  || — || November 17, 2001 || Socorro || LINEAR || CLO || align=right | 1.9 km || 
|-id=435 bgcolor=#fefefe
| 461435 ||  || — || December 14, 2001 || Socorro || LINEAR || — || align=right data-sort-value="0.71" | 710 m || 
|-id=436 bgcolor=#E9E9E9
| 461436 ||  || — || December 18, 2001 || Socorro || LINEAR || — || align=right | 2.5 km || 
|-id=437 bgcolor=#E9E9E9
| 461437 ||  || — || January 8, 2002 || Socorro || LINEAR || — || align=right | 1.9 km || 
|-id=438 bgcolor=#E9E9E9
| 461438 ||  || — || December 18, 2001 || Kitt Peak || Spacewatch || — || align=right | 2.4 km || 
|-id=439 bgcolor=#E9E9E9
| 461439 ||  || — || February 10, 2002 || Socorro || LINEAR || — || align=right | 2.4 km || 
|-id=440 bgcolor=#E9E9E9
| 461440 ||  || — || February 11, 2002 || Socorro || LINEAR || — || align=right | 2.6 km || 
|-id=441 bgcolor=#E9E9E9
| 461441 ||  || — || March 12, 2002 || Socorro || LINEAR || — || align=right | 2.5 km || 
|-id=442 bgcolor=#fefefe
| 461442 ||  || — || February 10, 2002 || Socorro || LINEAR || — || align=right data-sort-value="0.74" | 740 m || 
|-id=443 bgcolor=#fefefe
| 461443 ||  || — || March 9, 2002 || Kitt Peak || Spacewatch || — || align=right data-sort-value="0.65" | 650 m || 
|-id=444 bgcolor=#E9E9E9
| 461444 ||  || — || March 12, 2002 || Palomar || NEAT || — || align=right | 2.6 km || 
|-id=445 bgcolor=#E9E9E9
| 461445 ||  || — || March 14, 2002 || Kitt Peak || Spacewatch || — || align=right | 2.4 km || 
|-id=446 bgcolor=#fefefe
| 461446 ||  || — || April 11, 2002 || Palomar || NEAT || — || align=right | 1.0 km || 
|-id=447 bgcolor=#E9E9E9
| 461447 ||  || — || April 8, 2002 || Palomar || NEAT || — || align=right | 2.1 km || 
|-id=448 bgcolor=#fefefe
| 461448 ||  || — || April 10, 2002 || Socorro || LINEAR || — || align=right data-sort-value="0.70" | 700 m || 
|-id=449 bgcolor=#fefefe
| 461449 ||  || — || April 10, 2002 || Socorro || LINEAR || — || align=right data-sort-value="0.81" | 810 m || 
|-id=450 bgcolor=#E9E9E9
| 461450 ||  || — || May 9, 2007 || Mount Lemmon || Mount Lemmon Survey || — || align=right | 2.9 km || 
|-id=451 bgcolor=#fefefe
| 461451 ||  || — || May 11, 2002 || Socorro || LINEAR || — || align=right data-sort-value="0.77" | 770 m || 
|-id=452 bgcolor=#d6d6d6
| 461452 ||  || — || July 4, 2002 || Kitt Peak || Spacewatch || — || align=right | 2.8 km || 
|-id=453 bgcolor=#fefefe
| 461453 ||  || — || April 17, 2009 || Kitt Peak || Spacewatch || — || align=right | 1.1 km || 
|-id=454 bgcolor=#fefefe
| 461454 ||  || — || July 7, 2002 || Kitt Peak || Spacewatch || — || align=right data-sort-value="0.75" | 750 m || 
|-id=455 bgcolor=#fefefe
| 461455 ||  || — || August 8, 2002 || Palomar || NEAT || — || align=right | 1.00 km || 
|-id=456 bgcolor=#d6d6d6
| 461456 ||  || — || August 8, 2002 || Palomar || NEAT || — || align=right | 3.1 km || 
|-id=457 bgcolor=#d6d6d6
| 461457 ||  || — || August 14, 2002 || Palomar || R. Matson || EOS || align=right | 1.8 km || 
|-id=458 bgcolor=#d6d6d6
| 461458 ||  || — || August 11, 2002 || Palomar || NEAT || — || align=right | 3.4 km || 
|-id=459 bgcolor=#fefefe
| 461459 ||  || — || March 19, 2009 || Mount Lemmon || Mount Lemmon Survey || — || align=right data-sort-value="0.66" | 660 m || 
|-id=460 bgcolor=#d6d6d6
| 461460 ||  || — || July 7, 2002 || Kitt Peak || Spacewatch || — || align=right | 2.2 km || 
|-id=461 bgcolor=#d6d6d6
| 461461 ||  || — || August 30, 2002 || Kitt Peak || Spacewatch || — || align=right | 2.7 km || 
|-id=462 bgcolor=#fefefe
| 461462 ||  || — || August 16, 2002 || Palomar || A. Lowe || — || align=right | 1.1 km || 
|-id=463 bgcolor=#d6d6d6
| 461463 ||  || — || August 29, 2002 || Palomar || S. F. Hönig || — || align=right | 2.7 km || 
|-id=464 bgcolor=#d6d6d6
| 461464 ||  || — || August 30, 2002 || Palomar || NEAT || — || align=right | 2.8 km || 
|-id=465 bgcolor=#d6d6d6
| 461465 ||  || — || August 19, 2002 || Palomar || NEAT || EOS || align=right | 1.8 km || 
|-id=466 bgcolor=#d6d6d6
| 461466 ||  || — || August 18, 2002 || Palomar || NEAT || — || align=right | 2.3 km || 
|-id=467 bgcolor=#d6d6d6
| 461467 ||  || — || August 19, 2002 || Palomar || NEAT || EOS || align=right | 2.0 km || 
|-id=468 bgcolor=#d6d6d6
| 461468 ||  || — || August 28, 2002 || Palomar || NEAT || — || align=right | 2.3 km || 
|-id=469 bgcolor=#d6d6d6
| 461469 ||  || — || August 16, 2002 || Haleakala || NEAT || — || align=right | 2.7 km || 
|-id=470 bgcolor=#d6d6d6
| 461470 ||  || — || August 28, 2002 || Palomar || NEAT || — || align=right | 2.5 km || 
|-id=471 bgcolor=#d6d6d6
| 461471 ||  || — || October 10, 2008 || Mount Lemmon || Mount Lemmon Survey || EOS || align=right | 1.5 km || 
|-id=472 bgcolor=#fefefe
| 461472 ||  || — || September 5, 2002 || Socorro || LINEAR || — || align=right | 1.1 km || 
|-id=473 bgcolor=#fefefe
| 461473 ||  || — || September 5, 2002 || Socorro || LINEAR || NYS || align=right data-sort-value="0.62" | 620 m || 
|-id=474 bgcolor=#fefefe
| 461474 ||  || — || September 11, 2002 || Palomar || NEAT || — || align=right data-sort-value="0.69" | 690 m || 
|-id=475 bgcolor=#d6d6d6
| 461475 ||  || — || September 7, 2002 || Socorro || LINEAR || — || align=right | 3.6 km || 
|-id=476 bgcolor=#d6d6d6
| 461476 ||  || — || September 12, 2002 || Palomar || NEAT || EOS || align=right | 2.1 km || 
|-id=477 bgcolor=#d6d6d6
| 461477 ||  || — || September 14, 2002 || Palomar || NEAT || LIX || align=right | 3.1 km || 
|-id=478 bgcolor=#fefefe
| 461478 ||  || — || September 14, 2002 || Palomar || R. Matson || V || align=right data-sort-value="0.70" | 700 m || 
|-id=479 bgcolor=#d6d6d6
| 461479 ||  || — || October 5, 2002 || Apache Point || SDSS || EOS || align=right | 1.7 km || 
|-id=480 bgcolor=#fefefe
| 461480 ||  || — || September 15, 2002 || Palomar || NEAT || — || align=right data-sort-value="0.96" | 960 m || 
|-id=481 bgcolor=#d6d6d6
| 461481 ||  || — || September 13, 2002 || Palomar || NEAT || HYG || align=right | 2.5 km || 
|-id=482 bgcolor=#fefefe
| 461482 ||  || — || September 4, 2002 || Palomar || NEAT || NYS || align=right data-sort-value="0.60" | 600 m || 
|-id=483 bgcolor=#fefefe
| 461483 ||  || — || October 2, 2006 || Mount Lemmon || Mount Lemmon Survey || — || align=right data-sort-value="0.83" | 830 m || 
|-id=484 bgcolor=#d6d6d6
| 461484 ||  || — || September 12, 2002 || Palomar || NEAT || — || align=right | 3.1 km || 
|-id=485 bgcolor=#fefefe
| 461485 ||  || — || September 28, 2002 || Haleakala || NEAT || NYS || align=right data-sort-value="0.90" | 900 m || 
|-id=486 bgcolor=#d6d6d6
| 461486 ||  || — || September 27, 2002 || Palomar || NEAT || — || align=right | 3.7 km || 
|-id=487 bgcolor=#d6d6d6
| 461487 ||  || — || October 6, 2002 || Socorro || LINEAR || TIR || align=right | 3.0 km || 
|-id=488 bgcolor=#d6d6d6
| 461488 ||  || — || October 10, 2002 || Socorro || LINEAR || Tj (2.98) || align=right | 3.5 km || 
|-id=489 bgcolor=#d6d6d6
| 461489 ||  || — || October 4, 2002 || Apache Point || SDSS || — || align=right | 2.9 km || 
|-id=490 bgcolor=#d6d6d6
| 461490 ||  || — || October 5, 2002 || Apache Point || SDSS || — || align=right | 2.6 km || 
|-id=491 bgcolor=#d6d6d6
| 461491 ||  || — || October 5, 2002 || Apache Point || SDSS || — || align=right | 2.7 km || 
|-id=492 bgcolor=#d6d6d6
| 461492 ||  || — || October 31, 2002 || Palomar || NEAT || — || align=right | 2.9 km || 
|-id=493 bgcolor=#d6d6d6
| 461493 ||  || — || January 16, 2004 || Kitt Peak || Spacewatch || — || align=right | 3.4 km || 
|-id=494 bgcolor=#E9E9E9
| 461494 ||  || — || November 24, 2002 || Palomar || NEAT || — || align=right | 1.3 km || 
|-id=495 bgcolor=#E9E9E9
| 461495 ||  || — || December 10, 2002 || Palomar || NEAT || — || align=right data-sort-value="0.99" | 990 m || 
|-id=496 bgcolor=#E9E9E9
| 461496 ||  || — || January 7, 2003 || Socorro || LINEAR || — || align=right | 1.0 km || 
|-id=497 bgcolor=#E9E9E9
| 461497 ||  || — || January 7, 2003 || Socorro || LINEAR || — || align=right | 2.9 km || 
|-id=498 bgcolor=#E9E9E9
| 461498 ||  || — || January 30, 2003 || Anderson Mesa || LONEOS || — || align=right | 1.6 km || 
|-id=499 bgcolor=#E9E9E9
| 461499 ||  || — || January 31, 2003 || Socorro || LINEAR || — || align=right | 1.5 km || 
|-id=500 bgcolor=#E9E9E9
| 461500 ||  || — || January 26, 2003 || Kitt Peak || Spacewatch || — || align=right data-sort-value="0.94" | 940 m || 
|}

461501–461600 

|-bgcolor=#FFC2E0
| 461501 ||  || — || March 26, 2003 || Anderson Mesa || LONEOS || AMO || align=right data-sort-value="0.72" | 720 m || 
|-id=502 bgcolor=#fefefe
| 461502 ||  || — || March 24, 2003 || Kitt Peak || Spacewatch || H || align=right data-sort-value="0.78" | 780 m || 
|-id=503 bgcolor=#E9E9E9
| 461503 ||  || — || March 31, 2003 || Cerro Tololo || DLS || — || align=right | 3.0 km || 
|-id=504 bgcolor=#E9E9E9
| 461504 ||  || — || April 25, 2003 || Campo Imperatore || CINEOS || — || align=right | 1.9 km || 
|-id=505 bgcolor=#fefefe
| 461505 ||  || — || May 22, 2003 || Kitt Peak || Spacewatch || — || align=right data-sort-value="0.60" | 600 m || 
|-id=506 bgcolor=#FA8072
| 461506 ||  || — || August 23, 2003 || Haleakala || NEAT || — || align=right | 1.1 km || 
|-id=507 bgcolor=#fefefe
| 461507 ||  || — || August 23, 2003 || Palomar || NEAT || — || align=right data-sort-value="0.79" | 790 m || 
|-id=508 bgcolor=#fefefe
| 461508 ||  || — || August 20, 2003 || Palomar || NEAT || — || align=right data-sort-value="0.83" | 830 m || 
|-id=509 bgcolor=#E9E9E9
| 461509 ||  || — || September 15, 2003 || Palomar || NEAT || — || align=right | 2.4 km || 
|-id=510 bgcolor=#fefefe
| 461510 ||  || — || September 15, 2003 || Anderson Mesa || LONEOS || — || align=right data-sort-value="0.74" | 740 m || 
|-id=511 bgcolor=#fefefe
| 461511 ||  || — || September 16, 2003 || Kitt Peak || Spacewatch || V || align=right data-sort-value="0.51" | 510 m || 
|-id=512 bgcolor=#fefefe
| 461512 ||  || — || September 18, 2003 || Palomar || NEAT || — || align=right | 1.2 km || 
|-id=513 bgcolor=#fefefe
| 461513 ||  || — || September 18, 2003 || Socorro || LINEAR || V || align=right data-sort-value="0.69" | 690 m || 
|-id=514 bgcolor=#fefefe
| 461514 ||  || — || September 18, 2003 || Socorro || LINEAR || — || align=right data-sort-value="0.82" | 820 m || 
|-id=515 bgcolor=#fefefe
| 461515 ||  || — || September 18, 2003 || Anderson Mesa || LONEOS || — || align=right data-sort-value="0.85" | 850 m || 
|-id=516 bgcolor=#fefefe
| 461516 ||  || — || September 16, 2003 || Palomar || NEAT || — || align=right | 1.4 km || 
|-id=517 bgcolor=#fefefe
| 461517 ||  || — || September 19, 2003 || Kitt Peak || Spacewatch || H || align=right data-sort-value="0.55" | 550 m || 
|-id=518 bgcolor=#fefefe
| 461518 ||  || — || September 19, 2003 || Anderson Mesa || LONEOS || — || align=right | 1.0 km || 
|-id=519 bgcolor=#d6d6d6
| 461519 ||  || — || September 20, 2003 || Socorro || LINEAR || — || align=right | 2.9 km || 
|-id=520 bgcolor=#fefefe
| 461520 ||  || — || September 18, 2003 || Socorro || LINEAR || — || align=right data-sort-value="0.84" | 840 m || 
|-id=521 bgcolor=#fefefe
| 461521 ||  || — || September 26, 2003 || Desert Eagle || W. K. Y. Yeung || — || align=right data-sort-value="0.76" | 760 m || 
|-id=522 bgcolor=#fefefe
| 461522 ||  || — || September 27, 2003 || Kitt Peak || Spacewatch || H || align=right data-sort-value="0.66" | 660 m || 
|-id=523 bgcolor=#d6d6d6
| 461523 ||  || — || September 28, 2003 || Kitt Peak || Spacewatch || — || align=right | 2.1 km || 
|-id=524 bgcolor=#fefefe
| 461524 ||  || — || September 22, 2003 || Anderson Mesa || LONEOS || — || align=right data-sort-value="0.84" | 840 m || 
|-id=525 bgcolor=#fefefe
| 461525 ||  || — || September 28, 2003 || Kitt Peak || Spacewatch || NYS || align=right data-sort-value="0.63" | 630 m || 
|-id=526 bgcolor=#fefefe
| 461526 ||  || — || September 17, 2003 || Palomar || NEAT || — || align=right data-sort-value="0.91" | 910 m || 
|-id=527 bgcolor=#fefefe
| 461527 ||  || — || September 16, 2003 || Kitt Peak || Spacewatch || — || align=right data-sort-value="0.68" | 680 m || 
|-id=528 bgcolor=#d6d6d6
| 461528 ||  || — || September 17, 2003 || Kitt Peak || Spacewatch || EOS || align=right | 1.6 km || 
|-id=529 bgcolor=#fefefe
| 461529 ||  || — || September 22, 2003 || Kitt Peak || Spacewatch || NYS || align=right data-sort-value="0.52" | 520 m || 
|-id=530 bgcolor=#d6d6d6
| 461530 ||  || — || September 27, 2003 || Apache Point || SDSS || EOS || align=right | 2.0 km || 
|-id=531 bgcolor=#fefefe
| 461531 ||  || — || September 21, 2003 || Kitt Peak || Spacewatch || — || align=right data-sort-value="0.65" | 650 m || 
|-id=532 bgcolor=#d6d6d6
| 461532 ||  || — || September 20, 2003 || Kitt Peak || Spacewatch || EOS || align=right | 1.5 km || 
|-id=533 bgcolor=#d6d6d6
| 461533 ||  || — || September 26, 2003 || Apache Point || SDSS || — || align=right | 2.6 km || 
|-id=534 bgcolor=#d6d6d6
| 461534 ||  || — || September 16, 2003 || Kitt Peak || Spacewatch || KOR || align=right | 1.2 km || 
|-id=535 bgcolor=#d6d6d6
| 461535 ||  || — || September 27, 2003 || Apache Point || SDSS || EOS || align=right | 1.7 km || 
|-id=536 bgcolor=#d6d6d6
| 461536 ||  || — || September 29, 2003 || Apache Point || SDSS || — || align=right | 2.1 km || 
|-id=537 bgcolor=#fefefe
| 461537 ||  || — || October 15, 2003 || Palomar || NEAT || — || align=right data-sort-value="0.90" | 900 m || 
|-id=538 bgcolor=#d6d6d6
| 461538 ||  || — || October 2, 2003 || Kitt Peak || Spacewatch || — || align=right | 2.9 km || 
|-id=539 bgcolor=#d6d6d6
| 461539 ||  || — || October 3, 2003 || Kitt Peak || Spacewatch || — || align=right | 2.3 km || 
|-id=540 bgcolor=#d6d6d6
| 461540 ||  || — || October 18, 2003 || Kitt Peak || Spacewatch || — || align=right | 3.0 km || 
|-id=541 bgcolor=#fefefe
| 461541 ||  || — || October 18, 2003 || Palomar || NEAT || — || align=right data-sort-value="0.85" | 850 m || 
|-id=542 bgcolor=#fefefe
| 461542 ||  || — || October 21, 2003 || Palomar || NEAT || — || align=right data-sort-value="0.86" | 860 m || 
|-id=543 bgcolor=#d6d6d6
| 461543 ||  || — || September 20, 2003 || Campo Imperatore || CINEOS || — || align=right | 2.4 km || 
|-id=544 bgcolor=#fefefe
| 461544 ||  || — || October 19, 2003 || Kitt Peak || Spacewatch || — || align=right data-sort-value="0.82" | 820 m || 
|-id=545 bgcolor=#d6d6d6
| 461545 ||  || — || September 18, 2003 || Kitt Peak || Spacewatch || — || align=right | 2.3 km || 
|-id=546 bgcolor=#fefefe
| 461546 ||  || — || October 20, 2003 || Kitt Peak || Spacewatch || V || align=right data-sort-value="0.64" | 640 m || 
|-id=547 bgcolor=#fefefe
| 461547 ||  || — || October 23, 2003 || Apache Point || SDSS || — || align=right data-sort-value="0.59" | 590 m || 
|-id=548 bgcolor=#fefefe
| 461548 ||  || — || October 20, 2003 || Kitt Peak || Spacewatch || — || align=right data-sort-value="0.72" | 720 m || 
|-id=549 bgcolor=#d6d6d6
| 461549 ||  || — || November 15, 2003 || Kitt Peak || Spacewatch || — || align=right | 4.1 km || 
|-id=550 bgcolor=#d6d6d6
| 461550 ||  || — || November 18, 2003 || Palomar || NEAT || — || align=right | 3.1 km || 
|-id=551 bgcolor=#d6d6d6
| 461551 ||  || — || November 18, 2003 || Palomar || NEAT || — || align=right | 3.6 km || 
|-id=552 bgcolor=#fefefe
| 461552 ||  || — || October 28, 2003 || Socorro || LINEAR || — || align=right data-sort-value="0.83" | 830 m || 
|-id=553 bgcolor=#d6d6d6
| 461553 ||  || — || September 23, 1997 || Kitt Peak || Spacewatch || — || align=right | 2.4 km || 
|-id=554 bgcolor=#d6d6d6
| 461554 ||  || — || November 19, 2003 || Palomar || NEAT || TIR || align=right | 3.0 km || 
|-id=555 bgcolor=#d6d6d6
| 461555 ||  || — || November 21, 2003 || Socorro || LINEAR || — || align=right | 3.8 km || 
|-id=556 bgcolor=#d6d6d6
| 461556 ||  || — || November 30, 2003 || Kitt Peak || Spacewatch || — || align=right | 2.7 km || 
|-id=557 bgcolor=#d6d6d6
| 461557 ||  || — || November 18, 2003 || Kitt Peak || Spacewatch || — || align=right | 2.6 km || 
|-id=558 bgcolor=#d6d6d6
| 461558 ||  || — || December 14, 2003 || Kitt Peak || Spacewatch || LIX || align=right | 3.4 km || 
|-id=559 bgcolor=#d6d6d6
| 461559 ||  || — || December 19, 2003 || Socorro || LINEAR || Tj (2.99) || align=right | 3.8 km || 
|-id=560 bgcolor=#d6d6d6
| 461560 ||  || — || December 28, 2003 || Socorro || LINEAR || — || align=right | 3.1 km || 
|-id=561 bgcolor=#d6d6d6
| 461561 ||  || — || January 16, 2004 || Kitt Peak || Spacewatch || — || align=right | 2.5 km || 
|-id=562 bgcolor=#d6d6d6
| 461562 ||  || — || January 19, 2004 || Kitt Peak || Spacewatch || — || align=right | 2.2 km || 
|-id=563 bgcolor=#d6d6d6
| 461563 ||  || — || February 18, 2004 || Socorro || LINEAR || — || align=right | 3.4 km || 
|-id=564 bgcolor=#d6d6d6
| 461564 ||  || — || February 18, 2004 || Kitt Peak || Spacewatch || — || align=right | 2.1 km || 
|-id=565 bgcolor=#fefefe
| 461565 ||  || — || March 10, 2004 || Palomar || NEAT || — || align=right data-sort-value="0.96" | 960 m || 
|-id=566 bgcolor=#E9E9E9
| 461566 ||  || — || March 12, 2004 || Palomar || NEAT || — || align=right | 1.1 km || 
|-id=567 bgcolor=#E9E9E9
| 461567 ||  || — || March 23, 2004 || Socorro || LINEAR || — || align=right | 1.0 km || 
|-id=568 bgcolor=#d6d6d6
| 461568 ||  || — || April 11, 2004 || Palomar || NEAT || 7:4* || align=right | 2.0 km || 
|-id=569 bgcolor=#E9E9E9
| 461569 ||  || — || April 24, 2004 || Socorro || LINEAR || — || align=right | 1.3 km || 
|-id=570 bgcolor=#E9E9E9
| 461570 ||  || — || May 10, 2004 || Kitt Peak || Spacewatch || — || align=right | 1.3 km || 
|-id=571 bgcolor=#E9E9E9
| 461571 ||  || — || July 11, 2004 || Socorro || LINEAR || — || align=right | 1.3 km || 
|-id=572 bgcolor=#E9E9E9
| 461572 ||  || — || July 14, 2004 || Socorro || LINEAR || — || align=right | 1.8 km || 
|-id=573 bgcolor=#E9E9E9
| 461573 ||  || — || June 14, 2004 || Palomar || NEAT || — || align=right | 1.6 km || 
|-id=574 bgcolor=#E9E9E9
| 461574 ||  || — || August 4, 2004 || Palomar || NEAT || — || align=right | 1.9 km || 
|-id=575 bgcolor=#fefefe
| 461575 ||  || — || August 8, 2004 || Palomar || NEAT || — || align=right data-sort-value="0.84" | 840 m || 
|-id=576 bgcolor=#FA8072
| 461576 ||  || — || August 3, 2004 || Siding Spring || SSS || — || align=right data-sort-value="0.72" | 720 m || 
|-id=577 bgcolor=#E9E9E9
| 461577 ||  || — || August 7, 2004 || Palomar || NEAT || — || align=right | 2.6 km || 
|-id=578 bgcolor=#d6d6d6
| 461578 ||  || — || August 7, 2004 || Palomar || NEAT || — || align=right | 3.6 km || 
|-id=579 bgcolor=#FA8072
| 461579 ||  || — || August 9, 2004 || Socorro || LINEAR || — || align=right data-sort-value="0.83" | 830 m || 
|-id=580 bgcolor=#E9E9E9
| 461580 ||  || — || August 8, 2004 || Socorro || LINEAR || — || align=right | 1.4 km || 
|-id=581 bgcolor=#E9E9E9
| 461581 ||  || — || August 9, 2004 || Palomar || NEAT || JUN || align=right | 1.2 km || 
|-id=582 bgcolor=#E9E9E9
| 461582 ||  || — || August 25, 2004 || Kitt Peak || Spacewatch || AGN || align=right data-sort-value="0.98" | 980 m || 
|-id=583 bgcolor=#E9E9E9
| 461583 ||  || — || August 8, 2004 || Anderson Mesa || LONEOS || — || align=right | 1.5 km || 
|-id=584 bgcolor=#E9E9E9
| 461584 ||  || — || September 8, 2004 || Socorro || LINEAR || — || align=right | 1.6 km || 
|-id=585 bgcolor=#FA8072
| 461585 ||  || — || September 11, 2004 || Socorro || LINEAR || — || align=right | 1.3 km || 
|-id=586 bgcolor=#fefefe
| 461586 ||  || — || August 26, 2004 || Catalina || CSS || — || align=right data-sort-value="0.62" | 620 m || 
|-id=587 bgcolor=#E9E9E9
| 461587 ||  || — || September 10, 2004 || Socorro || LINEAR || — || align=right | 2.2 km || 
|-id=588 bgcolor=#E9E9E9
| 461588 ||  || — || September 10, 2004 || Socorro || LINEAR || GEF || align=right | 1.2 km || 
|-id=589 bgcolor=#fefefe
| 461589 ||  || — || September 14, 2004 || Socorro || LINEAR || — || align=right data-sort-value="0.68" | 680 m || 
|-id=590 bgcolor=#FA8072
| 461590 ||  || — || September 11, 2004 || Kitt Peak || Spacewatch || — || align=right data-sort-value="0.68" | 680 m || 
|-id=591 bgcolor=#fefefe
| 461591 ||  || — || September 11, 2004 || Kitt Peak || Spacewatch || — || align=right data-sort-value="0.53" | 530 m || 
|-id=592 bgcolor=#E9E9E9
| 461592 ||  || — || September 11, 2004 || Kitt Peak || Spacewatch || — || align=right | 2.0 km || 
|-id=593 bgcolor=#fefefe
| 461593 ||  || — || September 15, 2004 || Kitt Peak || Spacewatch || H || align=right data-sort-value="0.73" | 730 m || 
|-id=594 bgcolor=#E9E9E9
| 461594 ||  || — || September 15, 2004 || Socorro || LINEAR || — || align=right | 1.8 km || 
|-id=595 bgcolor=#fefefe
| 461595 ||  || — || September 15, 2004 || Siding Spring || SSS || H || align=right data-sort-value="0.75" | 750 m || 
|-id=596 bgcolor=#fefefe
| 461596 ||  || — || September 21, 2004 || Socorro || LINEAR || H || align=right data-sort-value="0.73" | 730 m || 
|-id=597 bgcolor=#E9E9E9
| 461597 ||  || — || September 14, 2004 || Anderson Mesa || LONEOS || — || align=right | 2.6 km || 
|-id=598 bgcolor=#E9E9E9
| 461598 ||  || — || October 5, 2004 || Kitt Peak || Spacewatch || — || align=right | 1.8 km || 
|-id=599 bgcolor=#fefefe
| 461599 ||  || — || October 4, 2004 || Kitt Peak || Spacewatch || — || align=right data-sort-value="0.61" | 610 m || 
|-id=600 bgcolor=#fefefe
| 461600 ||  || — || October 4, 2004 || Kitt Peak || Spacewatch || — || align=right data-sort-value="0.63" | 630 m || 
|}

461601–461700 

|-bgcolor=#fefefe
| 461601 ||  || — || October 7, 2004 || Kitt Peak || Spacewatch || — || align=right data-sort-value="0.77" | 770 m || 
|-id=602 bgcolor=#E9E9E9
| 461602 ||  || — || October 7, 2004 || Kitt Peak || Spacewatch || — || align=right | 2.2 km || 
|-id=603 bgcolor=#E9E9E9
| 461603 ||  || — || October 7, 2004 || Kitt Peak || Spacewatch || — || align=right | 2.3 km || 
|-id=604 bgcolor=#E9E9E9
| 461604 ||  || — || October 7, 2004 || Kitt Peak || Spacewatch || — || align=right | 2.5 km || 
|-id=605 bgcolor=#fefefe
| 461605 ||  || — || October 7, 2004 || Kitt Peak || Spacewatch || — || align=right data-sort-value="0.71" | 710 m || 
|-id=606 bgcolor=#E9E9E9
| 461606 ||  || — || September 22, 2004 || Kitt Peak || Spacewatch || AGN || align=right | 1.1 km || 
|-id=607 bgcolor=#fefefe
| 461607 ||  || — || October 11, 2004 || Kitt Peak || Spacewatch || — || align=right data-sort-value="0.72" | 720 m || 
|-id=608 bgcolor=#fefefe
| 461608 ||  || — || October 10, 2004 || Kitt Peak || Spacewatch || — || align=right data-sort-value="0.62" | 620 m || 
|-id=609 bgcolor=#FA8072
| 461609 ||  || — || October 30, 2004 || Palomar || NEAT || H || align=right data-sort-value="0.85" | 850 m || 
|-id=610 bgcolor=#d6d6d6
| 461610 ||  || — || December 11, 2004 || Kitt Peak || Spacewatch || — || align=right | 3.6 km || 
|-id=611 bgcolor=#d6d6d6
| 461611 ||  || — || December 18, 2004 || Mount Lemmon || Mount Lemmon Survey || EOS || align=right | 2.0 km || 
|-id=612 bgcolor=#d6d6d6
| 461612 ||  || — || January 6, 2005 || Catalina || CSS || — || align=right | 1.5 km || 
|-id=613 bgcolor=#fefefe
| 461613 ||  || — || December 15, 2004 || Kitt Peak || Spacewatch || — || align=right data-sort-value="0.67" | 670 m || 
|-id=614 bgcolor=#fefefe
| 461614 ||  || — || January 7, 2005 || Kitt Peak || Spacewatch || V || align=right data-sort-value="0.58" | 580 m || 
|-id=615 bgcolor=#fefefe
| 461615 ||  || — || January 6, 2005 || Socorro || LINEAR || H || align=right data-sort-value="0.82" | 820 m || 
|-id=616 bgcolor=#d6d6d6
| 461616 ||  || — || January 13, 2005 || Kitt Peak || Spacewatch || — || align=right | 2.6 km || 
|-id=617 bgcolor=#fefefe
| 461617 ||  || — || January 13, 2005 || Socorro || LINEAR || — || align=right | 1.0 km || 
|-id=618 bgcolor=#fefefe
| 461618 ||  || — || January 13, 2005 || Kitt Peak || Spacewatch || — || align=right data-sort-value="0.77" | 770 m || 
|-id=619 bgcolor=#d6d6d6
| 461619 ||  || — || January 15, 2005 || Kitt Peak || Spacewatch || — || align=right | 2.8 km || 
|-id=620 bgcolor=#fefefe
| 461620 ||  || — || January 16, 2005 || Mauna Kea || C. Veillet || NYS || align=right data-sort-value="0.55" | 550 m || 
|-id=621 bgcolor=#fefefe
| 461621 ||  || — || January 19, 2005 || Kitt Peak || Spacewatch || — || align=right data-sort-value="0.75" | 750 m || 
|-id=622 bgcolor=#d6d6d6
| 461622 ||  || — || January 16, 2005 || Kitt Peak || Spacewatch || — || align=right | 3.0 km || 
|-id=623 bgcolor=#d6d6d6
| 461623 ||  || — || February 1, 2005 || Kitt Peak || Spacewatch || — || align=right | 2.6 km || 
|-id=624 bgcolor=#fefefe
| 461624 ||  || — || February 2, 2005 || Kitt Peak || Spacewatch || — || align=right data-sort-value="0.61" | 610 m || 
|-id=625 bgcolor=#FA8072
| 461625 ||  || — || March 4, 2005 || Catalina || CSS || — || align=right data-sort-value="0.85" | 850 m || 
|-id=626 bgcolor=#d6d6d6
| 461626 ||  || — || March 3, 2005 || Kitt Peak || Spacewatch || — || align=right | 2.6 km || 
|-id=627 bgcolor=#fefefe
| 461627 ||  || — || March 3, 2005 || Kitt Peak || Spacewatch || MAS || align=right data-sort-value="0.69" | 690 m || 
|-id=628 bgcolor=#fefefe
| 461628 ||  || — || February 5, 2005 || Palomar || NEAT || — || align=right data-sort-value="0.88" | 880 m || 
|-id=629 bgcolor=#fefefe
| 461629 ||  || — || March 9, 2005 || Kitt Peak || Spacewatch || — || align=right data-sort-value="0.61" | 610 m || 
|-id=630 bgcolor=#fefefe
| 461630 ||  || — || March 8, 2005 || Mount Lemmon || Mount Lemmon Survey || NYS || align=right data-sort-value="0.63" | 630 m || 
|-id=631 bgcolor=#d6d6d6
| 461631 ||  || — || March 9, 2005 || Mount Lemmon || Mount Lemmon Survey || — || align=right | 2.7 km || 
|-id=632 bgcolor=#fefefe
| 461632 ||  || — || March 4, 2005 || Mount Lemmon || Mount Lemmon Survey || NYS || align=right data-sort-value="0.54" | 540 m || 
|-id=633 bgcolor=#fefefe
| 461633 ||  || — || March 11, 2005 || Mount Lemmon || Mount Lemmon Survey || NYS || align=right data-sort-value="0.54" | 540 m || 
|-id=634 bgcolor=#FA8072
| 461634 ||  || — || March 10, 2005 || Catalina || CSS || Tj (2.89) || align=right | 1.4 km || 
|-id=635 bgcolor=#d6d6d6
| 461635 ||  || — || March 8, 2005 || Catalina || CSS || — || align=right | 2.8 km || 
|-id=636 bgcolor=#d6d6d6
| 461636 ||  || — || March 11, 2005 || Catalina || CSS || — || align=right | 4.4 km || 
|-id=637 bgcolor=#fefefe
| 461637 ||  || — || March 4, 2005 || Kitt Peak || Spacewatch || MAS || align=right data-sort-value="0.69" | 690 m || 
|-id=638 bgcolor=#d6d6d6
| 461638 ||  || — || March 9, 2005 || Catalina || CSS || Tj (2.99) || align=right | 2.9 km || 
|-id=639 bgcolor=#fefefe
| 461639 ||  || — || March 13, 2005 || Socorro || LINEAR || — || align=right | 1.1 km || 
|-id=640 bgcolor=#d6d6d6
| 461640 ||  || — || March 11, 2005 || Mayhill || A. Lowe || — || align=right | 3.0 km || 
|-id=641 bgcolor=#fefefe
| 461641 ||  || — || March 11, 2005 || Kitt Peak || Spacewatch || — || align=right data-sort-value="0.58" | 580 m || 
|-id=642 bgcolor=#d6d6d6
| 461642 ||  || — || March 4, 2005 || Mount Lemmon || Mount Lemmon Survey || — || align=right | 4.7 km || 
|-id=643 bgcolor=#d6d6d6
| 461643 ||  || — || March 12, 2005 || Kitt Peak || Spacewatch || — || align=right | 3.8 km || 
|-id=644 bgcolor=#fefefe
| 461644 ||  || — || March 13, 2005 || Mount Lemmon || Mount Lemmon Survey || — || align=right data-sort-value="0.59" | 590 m || 
|-id=645 bgcolor=#d6d6d6
| 461645 ||  || — || March 14, 2005 || Mount Lemmon || Mount Lemmon Survey || THB || align=right | 3.7 km || 
|-id=646 bgcolor=#d6d6d6
| 461646 ||  || — || March 10, 2005 || Anderson Mesa || LONEOS || — || align=right | 2.6 km || 
|-id=647 bgcolor=#fefefe
| 461647 ||  || — || March 11, 2005 || Kitt Peak || M. W. Buie || — || align=right data-sort-value="0.80" | 800 m || 
|-id=648 bgcolor=#d6d6d6
| 461648 ||  || — || March 8, 2005 || Mount Lemmon || Mount Lemmon Survey || — || align=right | 3.0 km || 
|-id=649 bgcolor=#d6d6d6
| 461649 ||  || — || April 1, 2005 || Catalina || CSS || — || align=right | 2.7 km || 
|-id=650 bgcolor=#fefefe
| 461650 Paisdezső ||  ||  || April 3, 2005 || Piszkéstető || K. Sárneczky || — || align=right | 1.3 km || 
|-id=651 bgcolor=#fefefe
| 461651 ||  || — || April 1, 2005 || Anderson Mesa || LONEOS || — || align=right data-sort-value="0.93" | 930 m || 
|-id=652 bgcolor=#fefefe
| 461652 ||  || — || March 9, 2005 || Mount Lemmon || Mount Lemmon Survey || NYS || align=right data-sort-value="0.49" | 490 m || 
|-id=653 bgcolor=#fefefe
| 461653 ||  || — || April 2, 2005 || Mount Lemmon || Mount Lemmon Survey || H || align=right data-sort-value="0.58" | 580 m || 
|-id=654 bgcolor=#fefefe
| 461654 ||  || — || April 2, 2005 || Mount Lemmon || Mount Lemmon Survey || MAS || align=right data-sort-value="0.55" | 550 m || 
|-id=655 bgcolor=#d6d6d6
| 461655 ||  || — || April 5, 2005 || Anderson Mesa || LONEOS || — || align=right | 3.8 km || 
|-id=656 bgcolor=#fefefe
| 461656 ||  || — || March 18, 2005 || Socorro || LINEAR || — || align=right data-sort-value="0.86" | 860 m || 
|-id=657 bgcolor=#d6d6d6
| 461657 ||  || — || April 5, 2005 || Mount Lemmon || Mount Lemmon Survey || THM || align=right | 2.2 km || 
|-id=658 bgcolor=#d6d6d6
| 461658 ||  || — || April 6, 2005 || Mount Lemmon || Mount Lemmon Survey || — || align=right | 3.1 km || 
|-id=659 bgcolor=#d6d6d6
| 461659 ||  || — || April 2, 2005 || Mount Lemmon || Mount Lemmon Survey || — || align=right | 3.5 km || 
|-id=660 bgcolor=#fefefe
| 461660 ||  || — || April 6, 2005 || Mount Lemmon || Mount Lemmon Survey || V || align=right data-sort-value="0.55" | 550 m || 
|-id=661 bgcolor=#d6d6d6
| 461661 ||  || — || March 4, 2005 || Mount Lemmon || Mount Lemmon Survey || — || align=right | 2.5 km || 
|-id=662 bgcolor=#fefefe
| 461662 ||  || — || April 7, 2005 || Mount Lemmon || Mount Lemmon Survey || MAS || align=right data-sort-value="0.68" | 680 m || 
|-id=663 bgcolor=#d6d6d6
| 461663 ||  || — || April 12, 2005 || Kitt Peak || Spacewatch || — || align=right | 2.5 km || 
|-id=664 bgcolor=#fefefe
| 461664 ||  || — || April 15, 2005 || Kitt Peak || Spacewatch || NYS || align=right data-sort-value="0.66" | 660 m || 
|-id=665 bgcolor=#fefefe
| 461665 ||  || — || March 18, 2005 || Catalina || CSS || — || align=right data-sort-value="0.95" | 950 m || 
|-id=666 bgcolor=#d6d6d6
| 461666 ||  || — || April 1, 2005 || Kitt Peak || Spacewatch || THM || align=right | 2.4 km || 
|-id=667 bgcolor=#d6d6d6
| 461667 ||  || — || April 12, 2005 || Kitt Peak || M. W. Buie || — || align=right | 2.3 km || 
|-id=668 bgcolor=#fefefe
| 461668 ||  || — || April 12, 2005 || Kitt Peak || M. W. Buie || MAS || align=right data-sort-value="0.54" | 540 m || 
|-id=669 bgcolor=#d6d6d6
| 461669 ||  || — || April 13, 2005 || Catalina || CSS || THB || align=right | 2.9 km || 
|-id=670 bgcolor=#fefefe
| 461670 ||  || — || April 17, 2005 || Kitt Peak || Spacewatch || — || align=right data-sort-value="0.90" | 900 m || 
|-id=671 bgcolor=#d6d6d6
| 461671 ||  || — || May 3, 2005 || Kitt Peak || Spacewatch || Tj (2.98) || align=right | 4.1 km || 
|-id=672 bgcolor=#fefefe
| 461672 ||  || — || May 6, 2005 || Kitt Peak || DLS || — || align=right data-sort-value="0.99" | 990 m || 
|-id=673 bgcolor=#d6d6d6
| 461673 ||  || — || May 4, 2005 || Kitt Peak || Spacewatch || — || align=right | 2.5 km || 
|-id=674 bgcolor=#d6d6d6
| 461674 ||  || — || May 7, 2005 || Catalina || CSS || Tj (2.91) || align=right | 3.6 km || 
|-id=675 bgcolor=#fefefe
| 461675 ||  || — || April 11, 2005 || Mount Lemmon || Mount Lemmon Survey || NYS || align=right data-sort-value="0.51" | 510 m || 
|-id=676 bgcolor=#d6d6d6
| 461676 ||  || — || May 11, 2005 || Socorro || LINEAR || — || align=right | 3.6 km || 
|-id=677 bgcolor=#fefefe
| 461677 ||  || — || April 30, 2005 || Kitt Peak || Spacewatch || — || align=right data-sort-value="0.74" | 740 m || 
|-id=678 bgcolor=#fefefe
| 461678 ||  || — || May 3, 2005 || Kitt Peak || Spacewatch || NYS || align=right data-sort-value="0.80" | 800 m || 
|-id=679 bgcolor=#fefefe
| 461679 ||  || — || June 2, 2005 || Catalina || CSS || — || align=right data-sort-value="0.80" | 800 m || 
|-id=680 bgcolor=#E9E9E9
| 461680 ||  || — || June 6, 2005 || Siding Spring || SSS || — || align=right | 1.4 km || 
|-id=681 bgcolor=#d6d6d6
| 461681 ||  || — || June 5, 2005 || Kitt Peak || Spacewatch || — || align=right | 3.3 km || 
|-id=682 bgcolor=#d6d6d6
| 461682 ||  || — || June 16, 2005 || Kitt Peak || Spacewatch || THB || align=right | 2.7 km || 
|-id=683 bgcolor=#E9E9E9
| 461683 ||  || — || June 28, 2005 || Palomar || NEAT || — || align=right | 1.5 km || 
|-id=684 bgcolor=#fefefe
| 461684 ||  || — || June 2, 2005 || Catalina || CSS || — || align=right data-sort-value="0.80" | 800 m || 
|-id=685 bgcolor=#E9E9E9
| 461685 ||  || — || June 15, 2005 || Mount Lemmon || Mount Lemmon Survey || — || align=right | 1.2 km || 
|-id=686 bgcolor=#fefefe
| 461686 ||  || — || June 29, 2005 || Kitt Peak || Spacewatch || — || align=right data-sort-value="0.88" | 880 m || 
|-id=687 bgcolor=#d6d6d6
| 461687 ||  || — || May 14, 2005 || Kitt Peak || Spacewatch || — || align=right | 2.8 km || 
|-id=688 bgcolor=#E9E9E9
| 461688 ||  || — || July 4, 2005 || Kitt Peak || Spacewatch || EUN || align=right | 1.2 km || 
|-id=689 bgcolor=#E9E9E9
| 461689 ||  || — || June 14, 2005 || Mount Lemmon || Mount Lemmon Survey || (5) || align=right data-sort-value="0.75" | 750 m || 
|-id=690 bgcolor=#E9E9E9
| 461690 ||  || — || July 4, 2005 || Palomar || NEAT || — || align=right | 1.2 km || 
|-id=691 bgcolor=#E9E9E9
| 461691 ||  || — || July 9, 2005 || Catalina || CSS || — || align=right | 1.7 km || 
|-id=692 bgcolor=#E9E9E9
| 461692 ||  || — || October 15, 2001 || Palomar || NEAT || — || align=right data-sort-value="0.93" | 930 m || 
|-id=693 bgcolor=#E9E9E9
| 461693 ||  || — || August 29, 2005 || Anderson Mesa || LONEOS || — || align=right | 2.1 km || 
|-id=694 bgcolor=#E9E9E9
| 461694 ||  || — || August 28, 2005 || Kitt Peak || Spacewatch || — || align=right | 1.2 km || 
|-id=695 bgcolor=#E9E9E9
| 461695 ||  || — || August 28, 2005 || Kitt Peak || Spacewatch || — || align=right data-sort-value="0.90" | 900 m || 
|-id=696 bgcolor=#E9E9E9
| 461696 ||  || — || August 28, 2005 || Kitt Peak || Spacewatch || — || align=right | 1.2 km || 
|-id=697 bgcolor=#E9E9E9
| 461697 ||  || — || August 28, 2005 || Kitt Peak || Spacewatch || — || align=right | 1.3 km || 
|-id=698 bgcolor=#E9E9E9
| 461698 ||  || — || August 30, 2005 || Palomar || NEAT || — || align=right | 1.7 km || 
|-id=699 bgcolor=#E9E9E9
| 461699 ||  || — || August 28, 2005 || Kitt Peak || Spacewatch || — || align=right | 2.0 km || 
|-id=700 bgcolor=#E9E9E9
| 461700 ||  || — || August 31, 2005 || Socorro || LINEAR || — || align=right | 2.1 km || 
|}

461701–461800 

|-bgcolor=#E9E9E9
| 461701 ||  || — || September 1, 2005 || Kitt Peak || Spacewatch || — || align=right data-sort-value="0.79" | 790 m || 
|-id=702 bgcolor=#E9E9E9
| 461702 ||  || — || July 30, 2005 || Palomar || NEAT || — || align=right | 2.2 km || 
|-id=703 bgcolor=#E9E9E9
| 461703 ||  || — || September 13, 2005 || Kitt Peak || Spacewatch || — || align=right | 1.5 km || 
|-id=704 bgcolor=#E9E9E9
| 461704 ||  || — || September 26, 2005 || Kitt Peak || Spacewatch || — || align=right | 1.4 km || 
|-id=705 bgcolor=#E9E9E9
| 461705 ||  || — || September 24, 2005 || Kitt Peak || Spacewatch || — || align=right | 2.0 km || 
|-id=706 bgcolor=#E9E9E9
| 461706 ||  || — || September 24, 2005 || Kitt Peak || Spacewatch || — || align=right | 2.3 km || 
|-id=707 bgcolor=#E9E9E9
| 461707 ||  || — || September 24, 2005 || Kitt Peak || Spacewatch || MAR || align=right data-sort-value="0.95" | 950 m || 
|-id=708 bgcolor=#E9E9E9
| 461708 ||  || — || September 26, 2005 || Kitt Peak || Spacewatch || — || align=right | 1.1 km || 
|-id=709 bgcolor=#E9E9E9
| 461709 ||  || — || September 27, 2005 || Kitt Peak || Spacewatch || (5) || align=right data-sort-value="0.81" | 810 m || 
|-id=710 bgcolor=#E9E9E9
| 461710 ||  || — || September 24, 2005 || Kitt Peak || Spacewatch || — || align=right | 1.2 km || 
|-id=711 bgcolor=#E9E9E9
| 461711 ||  || — || September 24, 2005 || Kitt Peak || Spacewatch || MRX || align=right | 1.0 km || 
|-id=712 bgcolor=#E9E9E9
| 461712 ||  || — || September 24, 2005 || Kitt Peak || Spacewatch || — || align=right | 1.2 km || 
|-id=713 bgcolor=#E9E9E9
| 461713 ||  || — || September 25, 2005 || Kitt Peak || Spacewatch || — || align=right | 2.1 km || 
|-id=714 bgcolor=#E9E9E9
| 461714 ||  || — || September 23, 2005 || Catalina || CSS || EUN || align=right | 1.2 km || 
|-id=715 bgcolor=#E9E9E9
| 461715 ||  || — || September 28, 2005 || Palomar || NEAT || — || align=right | 1.5 km || 
|-id=716 bgcolor=#E9E9E9
| 461716 ||  || — || September 25, 2005 || Kitt Peak || Spacewatch || — || align=right | 1.4 km || 
|-id=717 bgcolor=#E9E9E9
| 461717 ||  || — || September 27, 2005 || Kitt Peak || Spacewatch || — || align=right | 1.2 km || 
|-id=718 bgcolor=#E9E9E9
| 461718 ||  || — || September 27, 2005 || Kitt Peak || Spacewatch || — || align=right | 1.5 km || 
|-id=719 bgcolor=#E9E9E9
| 461719 ||  || — || September 28, 2005 || Palomar || NEAT || — || align=right | 1.5 km || 
|-id=720 bgcolor=#E9E9E9
| 461720 ||  || — || September 29, 2005 || Kitt Peak || Spacewatch || — || align=right | 1.4 km || 
|-id=721 bgcolor=#E9E9E9
| 461721 ||  || — || September 30, 2005 || Palomar || NEAT || — || align=right | 2.4 km || 
|-id=722 bgcolor=#E9E9E9
| 461722 ||  || — || September 30, 2005 || Mount Lemmon || Mount Lemmon Survey || — || align=right | 1.0 km || 
|-id=723 bgcolor=#E9E9E9
| 461723 ||  || — || September 30, 2005 || Mount Lemmon || Mount Lemmon Survey || — || align=right | 1.6 km || 
|-id=724 bgcolor=#E9E9E9
| 461724 ||  || — || October 1, 2005 || Kitt Peak || Spacewatch || — || align=right data-sort-value="0.81" | 810 m || 
|-id=725 bgcolor=#E9E9E9
| 461725 ||  || — || October 1, 2005 || Kitt Peak || Spacewatch || — || align=right | 1.1 km || 
|-id=726 bgcolor=#E9E9E9
| 461726 ||  || — || October 1, 2005 || Mount Lemmon || Mount Lemmon Survey || MIS || align=right | 2.8 km || 
|-id=727 bgcolor=#E9E9E9
| 461727 ||  || — || September 26, 2005 || Kitt Peak || Spacewatch || — || align=right | 1.2 km || 
|-id=728 bgcolor=#E9E9E9
| 461728 ||  || — || August 31, 2005 || Kitt Peak || Spacewatch || EUN || align=right | 1.2 km || 
|-id=729 bgcolor=#E9E9E9
| 461729 ||  || — || October 3, 2005 || Catalina || CSS || — || align=right | 2.2 km || 
|-id=730 bgcolor=#E9E9E9
| 461730 ||  || — || September 26, 2005 || Kitt Peak || Spacewatch || — || align=right | 1.2 km || 
|-id=731 bgcolor=#E9E9E9
| 461731 ||  || — || September 24, 2005 || Kitt Peak || Spacewatch || — || align=right | 1.2 km || 
|-id=732 bgcolor=#E9E9E9
| 461732 ||  || — || October 9, 2005 || Kitt Peak || Spacewatch || — || align=right | 1.7 km || 
|-id=733 bgcolor=#E9E9E9
| 461733 ||  || — || September 26, 2005 || Kitt Peak || Spacewatch || — || align=right | 1.7 km || 
|-id=734 bgcolor=#E9E9E9
| 461734 ||  || — || October 9, 2005 || Kitt Peak || Spacewatch || — || align=right | 1.2 km || 
|-id=735 bgcolor=#E9E9E9
| 461735 ||  || — || October 1, 2005 || Anderson Mesa || LONEOS || — || align=right | 1.7 km || 
|-id=736 bgcolor=#E9E9E9
| 461736 ||  || — || October 9, 2005 || Kitt Peak || Spacewatch || — || align=right | 1.7 km || 
|-id=737 bgcolor=#E9E9E9
| 461737 ||  || — || October 14, 2005 || Anderson Mesa || LONEOS || — || align=right | 2.1 km || 
|-id=738 bgcolor=#E9E9E9
| 461738 ||  || — || October 22, 2005 || Kitt Peak || Spacewatch || — || align=right | 2.4 km || 
|-id=739 bgcolor=#E9E9E9
| 461739 ||  || — || October 5, 2005 || Kitt Peak || Spacewatch || — || align=right | 1.7 km || 
|-id=740 bgcolor=#E9E9E9
| 461740 ||  || — || October 24, 2005 || Kitt Peak || Spacewatch || — || align=right | 2.2 km || 
|-id=741 bgcolor=#E9E9E9
| 461741 ||  || — || October 25, 2005 || Mount Lemmon || Mount Lemmon Survey || — || align=right | 1.8 km || 
|-id=742 bgcolor=#E9E9E9
| 461742 ||  || — || October 22, 2005 || Kitt Peak || Spacewatch || — || align=right data-sort-value="0.81" | 810 m || 
|-id=743 bgcolor=#E9E9E9
| 461743 ||  || — || October 22, 2005 || Kitt Peak || Spacewatch || — || align=right | 1.9 km || 
|-id=744 bgcolor=#E9E9E9
| 461744 ||  || — || October 1, 2005 || Mount Lemmon || Mount Lemmon Survey || — || align=right | 2.3 km || 
|-id=745 bgcolor=#E9E9E9
| 461745 ||  || — || October 25, 2005 || Kitt Peak || Spacewatch || — || align=right | 1.6 km || 
|-id=746 bgcolor=#E9E9E9
| 461746 ||  || — || October 26, 2005 || Kitt Peak || Spacewatch || — || align=right | 1.9 km || 
|-id=747 bgcolor=#FA8072
| 461747 ||  || — || October 26, 2005 || Anderson Mesa || LONEOS || — || align=right | 2.1 km || 
|-id=748 bgcolor=#E9E9E9
| 461748 ||  || — || October 24, 2005 || Kitt Peak || Spacewatch || — || align=right data-sort-value="0.87" | 870 m || 
|-id=749 bgcolor=#E9E9E9
| 461749 ||  || — || October 24, 2005 || Kitt Peak || Spacewatch || GEF || align=right | 1.3 km || 
|-id=750 bgcolor=#E9E9E9
| 461750 ||  || — || October 24, 2005 || Kitt Peak || Spacewatch || — || align=right | 1.0 km || 
|-id=751 bgcolor=#E9E9E9
| 461751 ||  || — || October 27, 2005 || Kitt Peak || Spacewatch || — || align=right | 1.9 km || 
|-id=752 bgcolor=#E9E9E9
| 461752 ||  || — || October 1, 2005 || Mount Lemmon || Mount Lemmon Survey || — || align=right | 2.2 km || 
|-id=753 bgcolor=#E9E9E9
| 461753 ||  || — || October 25, 2005 || Kitt Peak || Spacewatch || — || align=right | 2.3 km || 
|-id=754 bgcolor=#E9E9E9
| 461754 ||  || — || October 25, 2005 || Kitt Peak || Spacewatch || — || align=right | 2.2 km || 
|-id=755 bgcolor=#E9E9E9
| 461755 ||  || — || October 25, 2005 || Kitt Peak || Spacewatch || GEF || align=right | 1.1 km || 
|-id=756 bgcolor=#E9E9E9
| 461756 ||  || — || October 25, 2005 || Kitt Peak || Spacewatch || — || align=right | 1.7 km || 
|-id=757 bgcolor=#E9E9E9
| 461757 ||  || — || October 25, 2005 || Kitt Peak || Spacewatch || — || align=right | 1.3 km || 
|-id=758 bgcolor=#E9E9E9
| 461758 ||  || — || October 25, 2005 || Kitt Peak || Spacewatch || — || align=right | 3.1 km || 
|-id=759 bgcolor=#E9E9E9
| 461759 ||  || — || October 2, 2005 || Palomar || NEAT || EUN || align=right | 1.3 km || 
|-id=760 bgcolor=#E9E9E9
| 461760 ||  || — || October 23, 2005 || Catalina || CSS || — || align=right | 1.4 km || 
|-id=761 bgcolor=#E9E9E9
| 461761 ||  || — || September 29, 2005 || Kitt Peak || Spacewatch || — || align=right | 1.9 km || 
|-id=762 bgcolor=#E9E9E9
| 461762 ||  || — || October 27, 2005 || Kitt Peak || Spacewatch || — || align=right | 1.6 km || 
|-id=763 bgcolor=#E9E9E9
| 461763 ||  || — || October 27, 2005 || Mount Lemmon || Mount Lemmon Survey || — || align=right | 2.6 km || 
|-id=764 bgcolor=#E9E9E9
| 461764 ||  || — || October 26, 2005 || Kitt Peak || Spacewatch || — || align=right | 2.3 km || 
|-id=765 bgcolor=#E9E9E9
| 461765 ||  || — || October 26, 2005 || Kitt Peak || Spacewatch || — || align=right | 1.4 km || 
|-id=766 bgcolor=#E9E9E9
| 461766 ||  || — || October 26, 2005 || Kitt Peak || Spacewatch || — || align=right | 2.2 km || 
|-id=767 bgcolor=#E9E9E9
| 461767 ||  || — || October 26, 2005 || Kitt Peak || Spacewatch || — || align=right | 1.2 km || 
|-id=768 bgcolor=#E9E9E9
| 461768 ||  || — || October 28, 2005 || Mount Lemmon || Mount Lemmon Survey || — || align=right | 1.8 km || 
|-id=769 bgcolor=#FA8072
| 461769 ||  || — || October 27, 2005 || Mount Lemmon || Mount Lemmon Survey || — || align=right | 1.1 km || 
|-id=770 bgcolor=#E9E9E9
| 461770 ||  || — || October 22, 2005 || Kitt Peak || Spacewatch || WIT || align=right data-sort-value="0.90" | 900 m || 
|-id=771 bgcolor=#E9E9E9
| 461771 ||  || — || October 27, 2005 || Kitt Peak || Spacewatch || — || align=right | 2.1 km || 
|-id=772 bgcolor=#E9E9E9
| 461772 ||  || — || October 25, 2005 || Kitt Peak || Spacewatch || — || align=right | 1.4 km || 
|-id=773 bgcolor=#E9E9E9
| 461773 ||  || — || May 22, 2003 || Kitt Peak || Spacewatch || — || align=right | 2.0 km || 
|-id=774 bgcolor=#E9E9E9
| 461774 ||  || — || October 30, 2005 || Catalina || CSS || — || align=right | 2.9 km || 
|-id=775 bgcolor=#E9E9E9
| 461775 ||  || — || October 30, 2005 || Mount Lemmon || Mount Lemmon Survey || — || align=right | 1.5 km || 
|-id=776 bgcolor=#E9E9E9
| 461776 ||  || — || October 29, 2005 || Mount Lemmon || Mount Lemmon Survey || — || align=right | 1.5 km || 
|-id=777 bgcolor=#E9E9E9
| 461777 ||  || — || October 25, 2005 || Kitt Peak || Spacewatch || WIT || align=right data-sort-value="0.85" | 850 m || 
|-id=778 bgcolor=#E9E9E9
| 461778 ||  || — || October 28, 2005 || Kitt Peak || Spacewatch || — || align=right | 2.1 km || 
|-id=779 bgcolor=#E9E9E9
| 461779 ||  || — || October 28, 2005 || Mount Lemmon || Mount Lemmon Survey || EUN || align=right | 1.3 km || 
|-id=780 bgcolor=#E9E9E9
| 461780 ||  || — || September 30, 2005 || Anderson Mesa || LONEOS || — || align=right | 1.8 km || 
|-id=781 bgcolor=#E9E9E9
| 461781 ||  || — || October 28, 2005 || Kitt Peak || Spacewatch || AGN || align=right | 1.0 km || 
|-id=782 bgcolor=#E9E9E9
| 461782 ||  || — || October 26, 2005 || Kitt Peak || Spacewatch || — || align=right | 1.8 km || 
|-id=783 bgcolor=#E9E9E9
| 461783 ||  || — || November 1, 2005 || Socorro || LINEAR || — || align=right | 2.8 km || 
|-id=784 bgcolor=#E9E9E9
| 461784 ||  || — || October 1, 2005 || Mount Lemmon || Mount Lemmon Survey || — || align=right | 2.3 km || 
|-id=785 bgcolor=#E9E9E9
| 461785 ||  || — || November 1, 2005 || Kitt Peak || Spacewatch || — || align=right | 1.8 km || 
|-id=786 bgcolor=#E9E9E9
| 461786 ||  || — || November 1, 2005 || Kitt Peak || Spacewatch || — || align=right | 1.2 km || 
|-id=787 bgcolor=#E9E9E9
| 461787 ||  || — || November 2, 2005 || Mount Lemmon || Mount Lemmon Survey || — || align=right | 1.4 km || 
|-id=788 bgcolor=#E9E9E9
| 461788 ||  || — || November 3, 2005 || Mount Lemmon || Mount Lemmon Survey || EUN || align=right | 1.5 km || 
|-id=789 bgcolor=#E9E9E9
| 461789 ||  || — || November 5, 2005 || Mount Lemmon || Mount Lemmon Survey || — || align=right | 1.3 km || 
|-id=790 bgcolor=#E9E9E9
| 461790 ||  || — || October 25, 2005 || Kitt Peak || Spacewatch || — || align=right | 1.6 km || 
|-id=791 bgcolor=#E9E9E9
| 461791 ||  || — || November 1, 2005 || Mount Lemmon || Mount Lemmon Survey || — || align=right | 1.3 km || 
|-id=792 bgcolor=#E9E9E9
| 461792 ||  || — || March 27, 2003 || Kitt Peak || Spacewatch || — || align=right | 1.5 km || 
|-id=793 bgcolor=#E9E9E9
| 461793 ||  || — || September 30, 2005 || Mount Lemmon || Mount Lemmon Survey || — || align=right | 1.1 km || 
|-id=794 bgcolor=#E9E9E9
| 461794 ||  || — || November 1, 2005 || Apache Point || A. C. Becker || — || align=right | 1.2 km || 
|-id=795 bgcolor=#E9E9E9
| 461795 ||  || — || November 22, 2005 || Kitt Peak || Spacewatch || EUN || align=right | 1.2 km || 
|-id=796 bgcolor=#E9E9E9
| 461796 ||  || — || November 21, 2005 || Kitt Peak || Spacewatch || — || align=right | 2.6 km || 
|-id=797 bgcolor=#E9E9E9
| 461797 ||  || — || November 25, 2005 || Mount Lemmon || Mount Lemmon Survey || — || align=right | 1.3 km || 
|-id=798 bgcolor=#fefefe
| 461798 ||  || — || November 25, 2005 || Mount Lemmon || Mount Lemmon Survey || — || align=right data-sort-value="0.54" | 540 m || 
|-id=799 bgcolor=#E9E9E9
| 461799 ||  || — || November 30, 2005 || Socorro || LINEAR || — || align=right | 2.2 km || 
|-id=800 bgcolor=#fefefe
| 461800 ||  || — || December 2, 2005 || Kitt Peak || Spacewatch || — || align=right data-sort-value="0.59" | 590 m || 
|}

461801–461900 

|-bgcolor=#E9E9E9
| 461801 ||  || — || November 29, 2005 || Kitt Peak || Spacewatch || AGN || align=right | 1.1 km || 
|-id=802 bgcolor=#E9E9E9
| 461802 ||  || — || December 22, 2005 || Kitt Peak || Spacewatch || — || align=right | 2.2 km || 
|-id=803 bgcolor=#E9E9E9
| 461803 ||  || — || December 22, 2005 || Kitt Peak || Spacewatch || — || align=right | 1.9 km || 
|-id=804 bgcolor=#E9E9E9
| 461804 ||  || — || October 1, 2005 || Mount Lemmon || Mount Lemmon Survey || MRX || align=right | 1.0 km || 
|-id=805 bgcolor=#E9E9E9
| 461805 ||  || — || December 22, 2005 || Kitt Peak || Spacewatch || — || align=right | 2.2 km || 
|-id=806 bgcolor=#E9E9E9
| 461806 ||  || — || December 24, 2005 || Kitt Peak || Spacewatch || GEF || align=right | 1.4 km || 
|-id=807 bgcolor=#fefefe
| 461807 ||  || — || March 23, 2003 || Apache Point || SDSS || — || align=right data-sort-value="0.53" | 530 m || 
|-id=808 bgcolor=#E9E9E9
| 461808 ||  || — || December 24, 2005 || Kitt Peak || Spacewatch || AGN || align=right | 1.1 km || 
|-id=809 bgcolor=#d6d6d6
| 461809 ||  || — || December 24, 2005 || Kitt Peak || Spacewatch || — || align=right | 3.6 km || 
|-id=810 bgcolor=#fefefe
| 461810 ||  || — || December 26, 2005 || Kitt Peak || Spacewatch || — || align=right data-sort-value="0.64" | 640 m || 
|-id=811 bgcolor=#E9E9E9
| 461811 ||  || — || December 26, 2005 || Mount Lemmon || Mount Lemmon Survey || — || align=right | 2.3 km || 
|-id=812 bgcolor=#fefefe
| 461812 ||  || — || December 30, 2005 || Kitt Peak || Spacewatch || — || align=right data-sort-value="0.49" | 490 m || 
|-id=813 bgcolor=#d6d6d6
| 461813 ||  || — || December 25, 2005 || Mount Lemmon || Mount Lemmon Survey || — || align=right | 2.1 km || 
|-id=814 bgcolor=#E9E9E9
| 461814 ||  || — || December 8, 2005 || Kitt Peak || Spacewatch || — || align=right | 1.8 km || 
|-id=815 bgcolor=#E9E9E9
| 461815 ||  || — || December 21, 2005 || Kitt Peak || Spacewatch || — || align=right | 3.0 km || 
|-id=816 bgcolor=#E9E9E9
| 461816 ||  || — || December 2, 2005 || Mount Lemmon || Mount Lemmon Survey || — || align=right | 2.1 km || 
|-id=817 bgcolor=#fefefe
| 461817 ||  || — || January 6, 2006 || Kitt Peak || Spacewatch || — || align=right data-sort-value="0.56" | 560 m || 
|-id=818 bgcolor=#E9E9E9
| 461818 ||  || — || December 4, 2005 || Mount Lemmon || Mount Lemmon Survey || — || align=right | 2.8 km || 
|-id=819 bgcolor=#d6d6d6
| 461819 ||  || — || December 28, 2005 || Kitt Peak || Spacewatch || KOR || align=right | 1.0 km || 
|-id=820 bgcolor=#E9E9E9
| 461820 ||  || — || January 4, 2006 || Kitt Peak || Spacewatch || AGN || align=right | 1.2 km || 
|-id=821 bgcolor=#E9E9E9
| 461821 ||  || — || January 23, 2006 || Kitt Peak || Spacewatch || — || align=right | 3.5 km || 
|-id=822 bgcolor=#d6d6d6
| 461822 ||  || — || January 23, 2006 || Kitt Peak || Spacewatch || — || align=right | 2.3 km || 
|-id=823 bgcolor=#E9E9E9
| 461823 ||  || — || January 23, 2006 || Kitt Peak || Spacewatch || — || align=right | 2.3 km || 
|-id=824 bgcolor=#d6d6d6
| 461824 ||  || — || January 23, 2006 || Kitt Peak || Spacewatch || — || align=right | 1.5 km || 
|-id=825 bgcolor=#fefefe
| 461825 ||  || — || January 23, 2006 || Kitt Peak || Spacewatch || — || align=right data-sort-value="0.75" | 750 m || 
|-id=826 bgcolor=#fefefe
| 461826 ||  || — || January 7, 2006 || Mount Lemmon || Mount Lemmon Survey || — || align=right data-sort-value="0.52" | 520 m || 
|-id=827 bgcolor=#fefefe
| 461827 ||  || — || January 26, 2006 || Kitt Peak || Spacewatch || — || align=right data-sort-value="0.71" | 710 m || 
|-id=828 bgcolor=#fefefe
| 461828 ||  || — || January 27, 2006 || Mount Lemmon || Mount Lemmon Survey || — || align=right data-sort-value="0.67" | 670 m || 
|-id=829 bgcolor=#E9E9E9
| 461829 ||  || — || January 27, 2006 || Kitt Peak || Spacewatch || — || align=right | 2.6 km || 
|-id=830 bgcolor=#fefefe
| 461830 ||  || — || January 27, 2006 || Mount Lemmon || Mount Lemmon Survey || — || align=right data-sort-value="0.56" | 560 m || 
|-id=831 bgcolor=#d6d6d6
| 461831 ||  || — || January 31, 2006 || Mount Lemmon || Mount Lemmon Survey || — || align=right | 1.8 km || 
|-id=832 bgcolor=#d6d6d6
| 461832 ||  || — || January 31, 2006 || Kitt Peak || Spacewatch || KOR || align=right | 1.3 km || 
|-id=833 bgcolor=#C2FFFF
| 461833 ||  || — || January 31, 2006 || Kitt Peak || Spacewatch || L5 || align=right | 9.7 km || 
|-id=834 bgcolor=#fefefe
| 461834 ||  || — || January 23, 2006 || Kitt Peak || Spacewatch || — || align=right data-sort-value="0.61" | 610 m || 
|-id=835 bgcolor=#d6d6d6
| 461835 ||  || — || January 30, 2006 || Kitt Peak || Spacewatch || — || align=right | 1.8 km || 
|-id=836 bgcolor=#FA8072
| 461836 ||  || — || February 1, 2006 || Catalina || CSS || — || align=right data-sort-value="0.86" | 860 m || 
|-id=837 bgcolor=#fefefe
| 461837 ||  || — || January 30, 2006 || Kitt Peak || Spacewatch || — || align=right data-sort-value="0.52" | 520 m || 
|-id=838 bgcolor=#fefefe
| 461838 ||  || — || February 7, 2006 || Mount Lemmon || Mount Lemmon Survey || — || align=right data-sort-value="0.58" | 580 m || 
|-id=839 bgcolor=#fefefe
| 461839 ||  || — || February 25, 2006 || Kitt Peak || Spacewatch || — || align=right data-sort-value="0.58" | 580 m || 
|-id=840 bgcolor=#d6d6d6
| 461840 ||  || — || February 25, 2006 || Kitt Peak || Spacewatch || — || align=right | 1.8 km || 
|-id=841 bgcolor=#d6d6d6
| 461841 ||  || — || February 25, 2006 || Kitt Peak || Spacewatch || KOR || align=right | 1.2 km || 
|-id=842 bgcolor=#d6d6d6
| 461842 ||  || — || February 25, 2006 || Mount Lemmon || Mount Lemmon Survey || EOS || align=right | 1.5 km || 
|-id=843 bgcolor=#C2FFFF
| 461843 ||  || — || February 2, 2006 || Mount Lemmon || Mount Lemmon Survey || L5 || align=right | 9.7 km || 
|-id=844 bgcolor=#fefefe
| 461844 ||  || — || February 22, 2006 || Catalina || CSS || — || align=right data-sort-value="0.68" | 680 m || 
|-id=845 bgcolor=#fefefe
| 461845 ||  || — || February 27, 2006 || Kitt Peak || Spacewatch || — || align=right data-sort-value="0.82" | 820 m || 
|-id=846 bgcolor=#d6d6d6
| 461846 ||  || — || March 2, 2006 || Kitt Peak || Spacewatch || — || align=right | 2.2 km || 
|-id=847 bgcolor=#fefefe
| 461847 ||  || — || March 4, 2006 || Kitt Peak || Spacewatch || H || align=right data-sort-value="0.49" | 490 m || 
|-id=848 bgcolor=#fefefe
| 461848 ||  || — || February 2, 2006 || Mount Lemmon || Mount Lemmon Survey || — || align=right data-sort-value="0.64" | 640 m || 
|-id=849 bgcolor=#fefefe
| 461849 ||  || — || March 5, 2006 || Kitt Peak || Spacewatch || — || align=right data-sort-value="0.71" | 710 m || 
|-id=850 bgcolor=#fefefe
| 461850 ||  || — || March 23, 2006 || Mount Lemmon || Mount Lemmon Survey || — || align=right data-sort-value="0.56" | 560 m || 
|-id=851 bgcolor=#fefefe
| 461851 ||  || — || March 24, 2006 || Mount Lemmon || Mount Lemmon Survey || — || align=right data-sort-value="0.62" | 620 m || 
|-id=852 bgcolor=#FFC2E0
| 461852 ||  || — || April 9, 2006 || Socorro || LINEAR || APOPHAmooncritical || align=right data-sort-value="0.62" | 620 m || 
|-id=853 bgcolor=#fefefe
| 461853 ||  || — || April 2, 2006 || Kitt Peak || Spacewatch || — || align=right data-sort-value="0.85" | 850 m || 
|-id=854 bgcolor=#fefefe
| 461854 ||  || — || April 2, 2006 || Kitt Peak || Spacewatch || — || align=right data-sort-value="0.77" | 770 m || 
|-id=855 bgcolor=#fefefe
| 461855 ||  || — || April 2, 2006 || Kitt Peak || Spacewatch || — || align=right data-sort-value="0.54" | 540 m || 
|-id=856 bgcolor=#d6d6d6
| 461856 ||  || — || April 8, 2006 || Kitt Peak || Spacewatch || — || align=right | 3.9 km || 
|-id=857 bgcolor=#d6d6d6
| 461857 ||  || — || April 20, 2006 || Kitt Peak || Spacewatch || — || align=right | 2.8 km || 
|-id=858 bgcolor=#d6d6d6
| 461858 ||  || — || April 18, 2006 || Kitt Peak || Spacewatch || — || align=right | 2.1 km || 
|-id=859 bgcolor=#d6d6d6
| 461859 ||  || — || April 20, 2006 || Kitt Peak || Spacewatch || — || align=right | 2.0 km || 
|-id=860 bgcolor=#fefefe
| 461860 ||  || — || April 19, 2006 || Kitt Peak || Spacewatch || — || align=right data-sort-value="0.73" | 730 m || 
|-id=861 bgcolor=#fefefe
| 461861 ||  || — || April 21, 2006 || Kitt Peak || Spacewatch || — || align=right data-sort-value="0.81" | 810 m || 
|-id=862 bgcolor=#fefefe
| 461862 ||  || — || March 25, 2006 || Kitt Peak || Spacewatch || H || align=right data-sort-value="0.76" | 760 m || 
|-id=863 bgcolor=#d6d6d6
| 461863 ||  || — || April 25, 2006 || Kitt Peak || Spacewatch || — || align=right | 2.9 km || 
|-id=864 bgcolor=#fefefe
| 461864 ||  || — || April 26, 2006 || Kitt Peak || Spacewatch || — || align=right data-sort-value="0.53" | 530 m || 
|-id=865 bgcolor=#d6d6d6
| 461865 ||  || — || April 26, 2006 || Kitt Peak || Spacewatch || — || align=right | 2.3 km || 
|-id=866 bgcolor=#d6d6d6
| 461866 ||  || — || April 29, 2006 || Kitt Peak || Spacewatch || — || align=right | 3.2 km || 
|-id=867 bgcolor=#fefefe
| 461867 ||  || — || April 30, 2006 || Kitt Peak || Spacewatch || — || align=right data-sort-value="0.66" | 660 m || 
|-id=868 bgcolor=#d6d6d6
| 461868 ||  || — || April 30, 2006 || Kitt Peak || Spacewatch || THM || align=right | 1.8 km || 
|-id=869 bgcolor=#d6d6d6
| 461869 ||  || — || April 30, 2006 || Kitt Peak || Spacewatch || VER || align=right | 2.5 km || 
|-id=870 bgcolor=#d6d6d6
| 461870 ||  || — || April 30, 2006 || Kitt Peak || Spacewatch || — || align=right | 3.5 km || 
|-id=871 bgcolor=#d6d6d6
| 461871 ||  || — || April 30, 2006 || Kitt Peak || Spacewatch || — || align=right | 2.4 km || 
|-id=872 bgcolor=#fefefe
| 461872 ||  || — || April 26, 2006 || Kitt Peak || Spacewatch || — || align=right data-sort-value="0.50" | 500 m || 
|-id=873 bgcolor=#fefefe
| 461873 ||  || — || March 27, 2006 || Siding Spring || SSS || — || align=right | 1.3 km || 
|-id=874 bgcolor=#fefefe
| 461874 ||  || — || May 1, 2006 || Kitt Peak || Spacewatch || — || align=right data-sort-value="0.63" | 630 m || 
|-id=875 bgcolor=#d6d6d6
| 461875 ||  || — || May 1, 2006 || Kitt Peak || Spacewatch || EOS || align=right | 1.7 km || 
|-id=876 bgcolor=#FA8072
| 461876 ||  || — || May 2, 2006 || Kitt Peak || Spacewatch || H || align=right data-sort-value="0.76" | 760 m || 
|-id=877 bgcolor=#d6d6d6
| 461877 ||  || — || April 21, 2006 || Kitt Peak || Spacewatch || — || align=right | 2.3 km || 
|-id=878 bgcolor=#fefefe
| 461878 ||  || — || April 24, 2006 || Mount Lemmon || Mount Lemmon Survey || — || align=right data-sort-value="0.62" | 620 m || 
|-id=879 bgcolor=#d6d6d6
| 461879 ||  || — || April 26, 2006 || Mount Lemmon || Mount Lemmon Survey || — || align=right | 2.5 km || 
|-id=880 bgcolor=#d6d6d6
| 461880 ||  || — || May 2, 2006 || Kitt Peak || Spacewatch || — || align=right | 2.8 km || 
|-id=881 bgcolor=#d6d6d6
| 461881 ||  || — || May 8, 2006 || Kitt Peak || Spacewatch || — || align=right | 3.6 km || 
|-id=882 bgcolor=#fefefe
| 461882 ||  || — || May 7, 2006 || Mount Lemmon || Mount Lemmon Survey || — || align=right data-sort-value="0.64" | 640 m || 
|-id=883 bgcolor=#fefefe
| 461883 ||  || — || March 25, 2006 || Kitt Peak || Spacewatch || — || align=right data-sort-value="0.63" | 630 m || 
|-id=884 bgcolor=#d6d6d6
| 461884 ||  || — || May 9, 2006 || Mount Lemmon || Mount Lemmon Survey || — || align=right | 2.6 km || 
|-id=885 bgcolor=#fefefe
| 461885 ||  || — || May 19, 2006 || Mount Lemmon || Mount Lemmon Survey || — || align=right data-sort-value="0.70" | 700 m || 
|-id=886 bgcolor=#d6d6d6
| 461886 ||  || — || May 20, 2006 || Kitt Peak || Spacewatch || — || align=right | 3.2 km || 
|-id=887 bgcolor=#fefefe
| 461887 ||  || — || May 7, 2006 || Mount Lemmon || Mount Lemmon Survey || — || align=right data-sort-value="0.55" | 550 m || 
|-id=888 bgcolor=#fefefe
| 461888 ||  || — || May 20, 2006 || Kitt Peak || Spacewatch || — || align=right data-sort-value="0.54" | 540 m || 
|-id=889 bgcolor=#d6d6d6
| 461889 ||  || — || May 5, 2006 || Kitt Peak || Spacewatch || — || align=right | 2.1 km || 
|-id=890 bgcolor=#d6d6d6
| 461890 ||  || — || May 20, 2006 || Kitt Peak || Spacewatch || — || align=right | 2.8 km || 
|-id=891 bgcolor=#d6d6d6
| 461891 ||  || — || May 20, 2006 || Kitt Peak || Spacewatch || — || align=right | 4.4 km || 
|-id=892 bgcolor=#fefefe
| 461892 ||  || — || May 8, 2006 || Mount Lemmon || Mount Lemmon Survey || — || align=right data-sort-value="0.78" | 780 m || 
|-id=893 bgcolor=#d6d6d6
| 461893 ||  || — || May 23, 2006 || Kitt Peak || Spacewatch || EOS || align=right | 1.5 km || 
|-id=894 bgcolor=#d6d6d6
| 461894 ||  || — || May 24, 2006 || Kitt Peak || Spacewatch || — || align=right | 2.8 km || 
|-id=895 bgcolor=#d6d6d6
| 461895 ||  || — || May 29, 2006 || Socorro || LINEAR || — || align=right | 3.4 km || 
|-id=896 bgcolor=#fefefe
| 461896 ||  || — || May 24, 2006 || Mount Lemmon || Mount Lemmon Survey || — || align=right data-sort-value="0.84" | 840 m || 
|-id=897 bgcolor=#fefefe
| 461897 ||  || — || May 25, 2006 || Kitt Peak || Spacewatch || — || align=right data-sort-value="0.70" | 700 m || 
|-id=898 bgcolor=#d6d6d6
| 461898 ||  || — || May 25, 2006 || Kitt Peak || Spacewatch || — || align=right | 2.9 km || 
|-id=899 bgcolor=#d6d6d6
| 461899 ||  || — || June 4, 2006 || Mount Lemmon || Mount Lemmon Survey || — || align=right | 2.9 km || 
|-id=900 bgcolor=#d6d6d6
| 461900 ||  || — || May 8, 2006 || Mount Lemmon || Mount Lemmon Survey || — || align=right | 3.3 km || 
|}

461901–462000 

|-bgcolor=#fefefe
| 461901 ||  || — || July 22, 2006 || Mount Lemmon || Mount Lemmon Survey || — || align=right data-sort-value="0.92" | 920 m || 
|-id=902 bgcolor=#fefefe
| 461902 ||  || — || July 25, 2006 || Palomar || NEAT || NYS || align=right data-sort-value="0.65" | 650 m || 
|-id=903 bgcolor=#fefefe
| 461903 ||  || — || August 13, 2006 || Palomar || NEAT || MAS || align=right data-sort-value="0.61" | 610 m || 
|-id=904 bgcolor=#d6d6d6
| 461904 ||  || — || August 14, 2006 || Siding Spring || SSS || — || align=right | 3.5 km || 
|-id=905 bgcolor=#fefefe
| 461905 ||  || — || August 15, 2006 || Lulin Observatory || C.-S. Lin, Q.-z. Ye || — || align=right data-sort-value="0.82" | 820 m || 
|-id=906 bgcolor=#fefefe
| 461906 ||  || — || August 12, 2006 || Palomar || NEAT || — || align=right data-sort-value="0.83" | 830 m || 
|-id=907 bgcolor=#FA8072
| 461907 ||  || — || August 17, 2006 || Palomar || NEAT || — || align=right data-sort-value="0.85" | 850 m || 
|-id=908 bgcolor=#fefefe
| 461908 ||  || — || August 20, 2006 || Palomar || NEAT || H || align=right data-sort-value="0.74" | 740 m || 
|-id=909 bgcolor=#FA8072
| 461909 ||  || — || August 24, 2006 || Palomar || NEAT || — || align=right data-sort-value="0.82" | 820 m || 
|-id=910 bgcolor=#d6d6d6
| 461910 ||  || — || August 16, 2006 || Palomar || NEAT || — || align=right | 3.0 km || 
|-id=911 bgcolor=#FA8072
| 461911 ||  || — || August 28, 2006 || Catalina || CSS || — || align=right | 1.1 km || 
|-id=912 bgcolor=#FFC2E0
| 461912 ||  || — || September 14, 2006 || Catalina || CSS || APO +1km || align=right data-sort-value="0.82" | 820 m || 
|-id=913 bgcolor=#fefefe
| 461913 ||  || — || July 21, 2006 || Mount Lemmon || Mount Lemmon Survey || — || align=right data-sort-value="0.72" | 720 m || 
|-id=914 bgcolor=#d6d6d6
| 461914 ||  || — || September 12, 2006 || Catalina || CSS || — || align=right | 3.5 km || 
|-id=915 bgcolor=#fefefe
| 461915 ||  || — || September 15, 2006 || Kitt Peak || Spacewatch || H || align=right data-sort-value="0.48" | 480 m || 
|-id=916 bgcolor=#fefefe
| 461916 ||  || — || September 15, 2006 || Kitt Peak || Spacewatch || — || align=right data-sort-value="0.68" | 680 m || 
|-id=917 bgcolor=#fefefe
| 461917 ||  || — || September 15, 2006 || Kitt Peak || Spacewatch || H || align=right data-sort-value="0.57" | 570 m || 
|-id=918 bgcolor=#FA8072
| 461918 ||  || — || September 14, 2006 || Mauna Kea || J. Masiero || — || align=right data-sort-value="0.45" | 450 m || 
|-id=919 bgcolor=#fefefe
| 461919 ||  || — || September 16, 2006 || Kitt Peak || Spacewatch || — || align=right data-sort-value="0.74" | 740 m || 
|-id=920 bgcolor=#E9E9E9
| 461920 ||  || — || September 17, 2006 || Kitt Peak || Spacewatch || — || align=right data-sort-value="0.64" | 640 m || 
|-id=921 bgcolor=#E9E9E9
| 461921 ||  || — || September 16, 2006 || Anderson Mesa || LONEOS || — || align=right data-sort-value="0.78" | 780 m || 
|-id=922 bgcolor=#fefefe
| 461922 ||  || — || September 17, 2006 || Kitt Peak || Spacewatch || V || align=right data-sort-value="0.59" | 590 m || 
|-id=923 bgcolor=#d6d6d6
| 461923 ||  || — || July 28, 2006 || Siding Spring || SSS || — || align=right | 4.4 km || 
|-id=924 bgcolor=#d6d6d6
| 461924 ||  || — || September 19, 2006 || Kitt Peak || Spacewatch || — || align=right | 3.2 km || 
|-id=925 bgcolor=#fefefe
| 461925 ||  || — || September 19, 2006 || Kitt Peak || Spacewatch || — || align=right data-sort-value="0.79" | 790 m || 
|-id=926 bgcolor=#fefefe
| 461926 ||  || — || September 19, 2006 || Kitt Peak || Spacewatch || — || align=right data-sort-value="0.83" | 830 m || 
|-id=927 bgcolor=#fefefe
| 461927 ||  || — || September 19, 2006 || Kitt Peak || Spacewatch || — || align=right | 1.0 km || 
|-id=928 bgcolor=#fefefe
| 461928 ||  || — || September 19, 2006 || Kitt Peak || Spacewatch || — || align=right data-sort-value="0.50" | 500 m || 
|-id=929 bgcolor=#fefefe
| 461929 ||  || — || September 23, 2006 || Kitt Peak || Spacewatch || MAS || align=right data-sort-value="0.51" | 510 m || 
|-id=930 bgcolor=#fefefe
| 461930 ||  || — || September 23, 2006 || Kitt Peak || Spacewatch || — || align=right data-sort-value="0.84" | 840 m || 
|-id=931 bgcolor=#fefefe
| 461931 ||  || — || September 24, 2006 || Kitt Peak || Spacewatch || — || align=right data-sort-value="0.71" | 710 m || 
|-id=932 bgcolor=#E9E9E9
| 461932 ||  || — || September 24, 2006 || Kitt Peak || Spacewatch || (5) || align=right data-sort-value="0.64" | 640 m || 
|-id=933 bgcolor=#fefefe
| 461933 ||  || — || March 8, 2005 || Mount Lemmon || Mount Lemmon Survey || MAS || align=right data-sort-value="0.70" | 700 m || 
|-id=934 bgcolor=#E9E9E9
| 461934 ||  || — || September 18, 2006 || Catalina || CSS || — || align=right | 1.0 km || 
|-id=935 bgcolor=#fefefe
| 461935 ||  || — || September 27, 2006 || Socorro || LINEAR || H || align=right data-sort-value="0.56" | 560 m || 
|-id=936 bgcolor=#E9E9E9
| 461936 ||  || — || September 17, 2006 || Kitt Peak || Spacewatch || — || align=right data-sort-value="0.75" | 750 m || 
|-id=937 bgcolor=#fefefe
| 461937 ||  || — || August 29, 2006 || Catalina || CSS || H || align=right data-sort-value="0.59" | 590 m || 
|-id=938 bgcolor=#d6d6d6
| 461938 ||  || — || September 26, 2006 || Kitt Peak || Spacewatch || — || align=right | 2.9 km || 
|-id=939 bgcolor=#E9E9E9
| 461939 ||  || — || September 27, 2006 || Mount Lemmon || Mount Lemmon Survey || — || align=right | 1.2 km || 
|-id=940 bgcolor=#d6d6d6
| 461940 ||  || — || September 19, 2006 || Catalina || CSS || — || align=right | 5.3 km || 
|-id=941 bgcolor=#E9E9E9
| 461941 ||  || — || September 26, 2006 || Kitt Peak || Spacewatch || — || align=right data-sort-value="0.78" | 780 m || 
|-id=942 bgcolor=#E9E9E9
| 461942 ||  || — || September 17, 2006 || Kitt Peak || Spacewatch || (5) || align=right data-sort-value="0.62" | 620 m || 
|-id=943 bgcolor=#E9E9E9
| 461943 ||  || — || September 27, 2006 || Kitt Peak || Spacewatch || — || align=right data-sort-value="0.66" | 660 m || 
|-id=944 bgcolor=#E9E9E9
| 461944 ||  || — || September 30, 2006 || Mount Lemmon || Mount Lemmon Survey || — || align=right data-sort-value="0.94" | 940 m || 
|-id=945 bgcolor=#E9E9E9
| 461945 ||  || — || September 30, 2006 || Mount Lemmon || Mount Lemmon Survey || — || align=right data-sort-value="0.84" | 840 m || 
|-id=946 bgcolor=#fefefe
| 461946 ||  || — || September 28, 2006 || Mount Lemmon || Mount Lemmon Survey || — || align=right data-sort-value="0.86" | 860 m || 
|-id=947 bgcolor=#fefefe
| 461947 ||  || — || September 25, 2006 || Mount Lemmon || Mount Lemmon Survey || — || align=right | 1.0 km || 
|-id=948 bgcolor=#fefefe
| 461948 ||  || — || September 25, 2006 || Mount Lemmon || Mount Lemmon Survey || — || align=right data-sort-value="0.87" | 870 m || 
|-id=949 bgcolor=#E9E9E9
| 461949 ||  || — || October 2, 2006 || Mount Lemmon || Mount Lemmon Survey || — || align=right data-sort-value="0.63" | 630 m || 
|-id=950 bgcolor=#d6d6d6
| 461950 ||  || — || October 13, 2006 || Eskridge || Farpoint Obs. || — || align=right | 3.2 km || 
|-id=951 bgcolor=#E9E9E9
| 461951 ||  || — || October 12, 2006 || Kitt Peak || Spacewatch || — || align=right data-sort-value="0.89" | 890 m || 
|-id=952 bgcolor=#fefefe
| 461952 ||  || — || October 12, 2006 || Kitt Peak || Spacewatch || — || align=right data-sort-value="0.81" | 810 m || 
|-id=953 bgcolor=#E9E9E9
| 461953 ||  || — || October 12, 2006 || Palomar || NEAT || — || align=right | 1.2 km || 
|-id=954 bgcolor=#E9E9E9
| 461954 ||  || — || October 13, 2006 || Kitt Peak || Spacewatch || (5) || align=right data-sort-value="0.68" | 680 m || 
|-id=955 bgcolor=#fefefe
| 461955 ||  || — || October 13, 2006 || Kitt Peak || Spacewatch || — || align=right data-sort-value="0.90" | 900 m || 
|-id=956 bgcolor=#E9E9E9
| 461956 ||  || — || October 13, 2006 || Kitt Peak || Spacewatch || (5) || align=right data-sort-value="0.76" | 760 m || 
|-id=957 bgcolor=#fefefe
| 461957 ||  || — || September 26, 2006 || Mount Lemmon || Mount Lemmon Survey || — || align=right data-sort-value="0.87" | 870 m || 
|-id=958 bgcolor=#fefefe
| 461958 ||  || — || September 28, 2006 || Mount Lemmon || Mount Lemmon Survey || — || align=right | 1.0 km || 
|-id=959 bgcolor=#E9E9E9
| 461959 ||  || — || September 27, 2006 || Mount Lemmon || Mount Lemmon Survey || — || align=right data-sort-value="0.94" | 940 m || 
|-id=960 bgcolor=#E9E9E9
| 461960 ||  || — || October 19, 2006 || Catalina || CSS || MAR || align=right | 1.4 km || 
|-id=961 bgcolor=#E9E9E9
| 461961 ||  || — || October 19, 2006 || Kitt Peak || Spacewatch || — || align=right data-sort-value="0.94" | 940 m || 
|-id=962 bgcolor=#FA8072
| 461962 ||  || — || October 23, 2006 || Socorro || LINEAR || — || align=right | 1.4 km || 
|-id=963 bgcolor=#E9E9E9
| 461963 ||  || — || September 28, 2006 || Mount Lemmon || Mount Lemmon Survey || — || align=right data-sort-value="0.90" | 900 m || 
|-id=964 bgcolor=#E9E9E9
| 461964 ||  || — || September 30, 2006 || Mount Lemmon || Mount Lemmon Survey || — || align=right | 1.2 km || 
|-id=965 bgcolor=#E9E9E9
| 461965 ||  || — || October 11, 2006 || Kitt Peak || Spacewatch || — || align=right data-sort-value="0.79" | 790 m || 
|-id=966 bgcolor=#E9E9E9
| 461966 ||  || — || October 19, 2006 || Kitt Peak || Spacewatch || (5) || align=right data-sort-value="0.61" | 610 m || 
|-id=967 bgcolor=#E9E9E9
| 461967 ||  || — || September 27, 2006 || Mount Lemmon || Mount Lemmon Survey || — || align=right | 1.1 km || 
|-id=968 bgcolor=#fefefe
| 461968 ||  || — || September 30, 2006 || Mount Lemmon || Mount Lemmon Survey || — || align=right data-sort-value="0.89" | 890 m || 
|-id=969 bgcolor=#E9E9E9
| 461969 ||  || — || September 19, 2006 || Kitt Peak || Spacewatch || (5) || align=right data-sort-value="0.63" | 630 m || 
|-id=970 bgcolor=#fefefe
| 461970 ||  || — || October 21, 2006 || Mount Lemmon || Mount Lemmon Survey || — || align=right data-sort-value="0.85" | 850 m || 
|-id=971 bgcolor=#E9E9E9
| 461971 ||  || — || October 21, 2006 || Kitt Peak || Spacewatch || — || align=right data-sort-value="0.75" | 750 m || 
|-id=972 bgcolor=#fefefe
| 461972 ||  || — || October 23, 2006 || Kitt Peak || Spacewatch || — || align=right data-sort-value="0.82" | 820 m || 
|-id=973 bgcolor=#fefefe
| 461973 ||  || — || October 27, 2006 || Mount Lemmon || Mount Lemmon Survey || — || align=right data-sort-value="0.81" | 810 m || 
|-id=974 bgcolor=#d6d6d6
| 461974 ||  || — || October 16, 2006 || Apache Point || A. C. Becker || — || align=right | 2.7 km || 
|-id=975 bgcolor=#E9E9E9
| 461975 ||  || — || October 16, 2006 || Kitt Peak || Spacewatch || — || align=right data-sort-value="0.78" | 780 m || 
|-id=976 bgcolor=#E9E9E9
| 461976 ||  || — || October 23, 2006 || Mount Lemmon || Mount Lemmon Survey || — || align=right | 2.0 km || 
|-id=977 bgcolor=#E9E9E9
| 461977 ||  || — || September 28, 2006 || Mount Lemmon || Mount Lemmon Survey || — || align=right data-sort-value="0.83" | 830 m || 
|-id=978 bgcolor=#E9E9E9
| 461978 ||  || — || September 27, 2006 || Mount Lemmon || Mount Lemmon Survey || — || align=right | 1.0 km || 
|-id=979 bgcolor=#E9E9E9
| 461979 ||  || — || September 28, 2006 || Mount Lemmon || Mount Lemmon Survey || — || align=right data-sort-value="0.72" | 720 m || 
|-id=980 bgcolor=#E9E9E9
| 461980 ||  || — || October 23, 2006 || Mount Lemmon || Mount Lemmon Survey || — || align=right | 1.1 km || 
|-id=981 bgcolor=#E9E9E9
| 461981 Chuyouhua ||  ||  || November 12, 2006 || Lulin || H.-C. Lin, Q.-z. Ye || — || align=right data-sort-value="0.95" | 950 m || 
|-id=982 bgcolor=#E9E9E9
| 461982 ||  || — || November 13, 2006 || Kitt Peak || Spacewatch || — || align=right | 1.0 km || 
|-id=983 bgcolor=#E9E9E9
| 461983 ||  || — || October 4, 2006 || Mount Lemmon || Mount Lemmon Survey || BRG || align=right | 1.2 km || 
|-id=984 bgcolor=#E9E9E9
| 461984 ||  || — || October 20, 2006 || Mount Lemmon || Mount Lemmon Survey || — || align=right | 1.3 km || 
|-id=985 bgcolor=#E9E9E9
| 461985 ||  || — || November 9, 2006 || Palomar || NEAT || — || align=right | 1.1 km || 
|-id=986 bgcolor=#E9E9E9
| 461986 ||  || — || November 11, 2006 || Kitt Peak || Spacewatch || critical || align=right data-sort-value="0.98" | 980 m || 
|-id=987 bgcolor=#E9E9E9
| 461987 ||  || — || November 11, 2006 || Kitt Peak || Spacewatch || — || align=right data-sort-value="0.72" | 720 m || 
|-id=988 bgcolor=#E9E9E9
| 461988 ||  || — || September 27, 2006 || Mount Lemmon || Mount Lemmon Survey || EUN || align=right | 1.4 km || 
|-id=989 bgcolor=#E9E9E9
| 461989 ||  || — || October 23, 2006 || Mount Lemmon || Mount Lemmon Survey || — || align=right data-sort-value="0.73" | 730 m || 
|-id=990 bgcolor=#E9E9E9
| 461990 ||  || — || November 16, 2006 || Kitt Peak || Spacewatch || (5) || align=right data-sort-value="0.72" | 720 m || 
|-id=991 bgcolor=#E9E9E9
| 461991 ||  || — || November 16, 2006 || Kitt Peak || Spacewatch || — || align=right data-sort-value="0.96" | 960 m || 
|-id=992 bgcolor=#E9E9E9
| 461992 ||  || — || November 16, 2006 || Kitt Peak || Spacewatch || — || align=right | 2.7 km || 
|-id=993 bgcolor=#E9E9E9
| 461993 ||  || — || October 22, 2006 || Mount Lemmon || Mount Lemmon Survey || — || align=right data-sort-value="0.82" | 820 m || 
|-id=994 bgcolor=#E9E9E9
| 461994 ||  || — || September 28, 2006 || Mount Lemmon || Mount Lemmon Survey || — || align=right data-sort-value="0.75" | 750 m || 
|-id=995 bgcolor=#E9E9E9
| 461995 ||  || — || November 19, 2006 || Kitt Peak || Spacewatch || — || align=right | 1.3 km || 
|-id=996 bgcolor=#E9E9E9
| 461996 ||  || — || November 19, 2006 || Kitt Peak || Spacewatch || (5) || align=right data-sort-value="0.87" | 870 m || 
|-id=997 bgcolor=#fefefe
| 461997 ||  || — || October 11, 2006 || Siding Spring || SSS || H || align=right | 1.1 km || 
|-id=998 bgcolor=#E9E9E9
| 461998 ||  || — || November 11, 2006 || Kitt Peak || Spacewatch || — || align=right | 1.3 km || 
|-id=999 bgcolor=#E9E9E9
| 461999 ||  || — || November 20, 2006 || Kitt Peak || Spacewatch || — || align=right data-sort-value="0.87" | 870 m || 
|-id=000 bgcolor=#E9E9E9
| 462000 ||  || — || November 10, 2006 || Kitt Peak || Spacewatch || — || align=right | 1.7 km || 
|}

References

External links 
 Discovery Circumstances: Numbered Minor Planets (460001)–(465000) (IAU Minor Planet Center)

0461